The 1917 New Year Honours were appointments by King George V to various orders and honours to reward and highlight good works by citizens of the British Empire. The appointments were published in several editions of The London Gazette in January and February.

The 1 January list contained only military honours earned during the ongoing war, particularly for the Battle of the Somme, while political honours were delayed. The announcement was celebrated by The Times in its New Year's Day reporting:

"It is a welcome change to publish a list of New Year's Honours which have been earned altogether in the honourable service of the State. What are sometimes called 'political honours' – the results too often of personal and party manoeuvres – seem indescribably repellent in these days of national strain. We cannot, unfortunately, congratulate ourselves that their omission to-day is anything more than a postponement; but for the moment at all events we have a list confined entirely to sailors and soldiers and to civilians whose claim to distinction rests wholly on public service. We rejoice especially in the well-timed promptness with which the official report of the greatest battle in English history is followed by a large recognition of the men responsible for its success."

The recipients of honours are displayed here as they were styled before their new honour, and arranged by honour, with classes (Knight, Knight Grand Cross, etc.) and then divisions (Military, Civil, etc.) as appropriate.

United Kingdom and British Empire

Viscount
The Right Honourable Weetman Pearson, Baron Cowdray, by the name, style and title of Viscount Cowdray, of Cowdray, in the county of Sussex. President of the Air Board.
The Right Honourable William Mansfield, Baron Sandhurst, by the name, style and title of Viscount Sandhurst, of Sandhurst, in the county of Berkshire. Lord Chamberlain of the Household.

Baron and Viscount
The Right Honourable Lewis Harcourt, by the names, styles and titles of Baron Nuneham, of Nuneham Courtenay, in the county of Oxford, and Viscount Harcourt, of Stanton Harcourt, in the said county of Oxford

Baron
Sir William Maxwell Aitken, by the name, style and title of Baron Beaverbrook, of Beaverbrook, in the Province of New Brunswick, in the Dominion of Canada, and of Cherkley, in the county of Surrey
Sir John Alexander Dewar, by the name, style and title of Baron Forteviot, of Dupplin, in the county of Perth
The Right Honourable Charles Beilby Stuart-Wortley, by the name, style and title of Baron Stuart of Wortley, of the city of Sheffield
Sir Edward Partington, by the name, style and title of Baron Doverdale, of Westwood Park, in the county of Worcester
The Right Honourable Joseph Albert Pease, by the name, style and title of Baron Gainford, of Headlam, in the county of Durham
Sir Thomas Roe, by the name, style and title of Baron Roe, of the borough of Derby

The Most Honourable Order of the Bath

Knight Grand Cross of the Order of the Bath (GCB)

Military Division

Army
General Sir William Robert Robertson, Colonel, 2nd Dragoons 
Surgeon-General Sir Alfred Keogh,

Civil Division
The Right Honourable Sir Samuel Thomas Evans, President of the Probate, Divorce and Admiralty Division of the High Court of Justice

Knight Commander of the Order of the Bath (KCB)

Military Division

Royal Navy
Vice-Admiral William Lowther Grant, 

Army
Major-General Sir Frederick Thomas Clayton,  
Major-General Frederick Ivor Maxse,  
Major-General Henry de Beauvoir De Lisle,  
Surgeon-General Hayward Reader Whitehead, 
Major-General Charles Toler MacMorrough Kavanagh,  
Major-General Walter Norris Congreve, 
Major-General Charles James Briggs,  
Major-General Edward Arthur Fanshawe,  
Major-General Claud William Jacob,  
Major-General The Honourable Herbert Alexander Lawrence,  
Surgeon-General William Donovan, 
Major-General Frederick Charles Shaw, 
Major-General Herbert Guthrie Smith, 
Major-General Robert Dundas Whigham, 
Colonel Neville Reginald Howse, Australian Army Medical Corps
Major-General Charles Herbert Powell, Indian Army

Civil Division
Maurice Bonham Carter, Private Secretary to the late Prime Minister and First Lord of the Treasury
Major John Norton-Griffiths, 2nd Regiment, King Edward's Horse
Colonel the Right Honourable William Heneage, Earl of Dartmouth, Honorary Colonel, North Midland Divisional Train, Army Service Corps (Territorial Force), President and Chairman Staffordshire Territorial Force Association
Sir Frederick William Black, Director General of Munitions Supply, Director of Contracts, Admiralty
Arthur Newsholme, Chief Medical Officer, Local Government Board
Oswyn Alexander Ruthven Murray, Assistant Secretary, Admiralty
Sir Herbert Ashcombe Walker, Acting Chairman of the Railway Executive Committee
Colonel The Honourable James Allen, Minister of Defence, New Zealand
Stephenson Kent, Director of the Department of Labour Supply, Ministry of Munitions
Arthur McDougal Duckham, Chairman of the Advisory Committee, Ministry of Munitions
Charles Ellis, Director General, Ordnance Supply, Ministry of Munitions
Eustace Henry Tennyson d'Eyncourt, Director of Naval Construction, Admiralty
Major General Sir Charles Crutchley, Governor of Chelsea Hospital

Companion of the Order of the Bath (CB)

Military Division
Royal Navy
Captain Anselan John Buchanan Stirling, in recognition of his services with a Destroyer Flotilla during the Battle of Jutland (dated 31 May 1916)
Vice-Admiral Richard Bowles Farquhar.
Rear-Admiral Godfrey Harry Brydges Mundy, .
Rear-Admiral Henry Hervey Campbell, 
Rear-Admiral Edmund Radcliffe Pears. 
Rear-Admiral Charles Lionel Vaughan-Lee.
Captain Brian Herbert Fairbairn Barttelot, 
Engineer Rear-Admiral William John Anstey. 
Inspector-General John Cassilis Birkmyre Maclean, MB, Royal Navy (retired).
Paymaster-in-chief William Le Geyt Pullen.

Army
Major-General Reginald John Pinney
Major-General Victor Arthur Couper
Major-General Oliver Stewart Wood Nugent, 
Major-General Richard Harte Keatinge Butler
Colonel Cecil Hill, Royal Engineers
Colonel Lionel Norton Herbert, Indian Army
Colonel Arthur Long, Royal Army Service Corps
Colonel James Murray Irwin, MB, late Royal Army Medical Corps
Colonel Steuart Wellwood Hare
Colonel Henry Brooke Hagstromer Wright, 
Colonel Godfrey Leicester Hibbert, 
Colonel Douglas Campbell
Colonel Richard Lucas Mullens
Colonel Edward Northey, 
Lieutenant-Colonel and Brevet Colonel George McKenzie Franks, Royal Artillery
Colonel Charles Guinand Blackader, 
Lieutenant-Colonel and Brevet Colonel Edward Peter Strickland, Manchester Regiment
Colonel Robert Lockhart Ross Macleod, MB, Army Medical Service
Colonel Gerald Cree, Army Medical Service
Colonel Alexander Arthur Button, Army Medical Service
Colonel George Henry Barefoot, Royal Army Medical Corps
Lieutenant-Colonel and Brevet Colonel Wilfrid Edward Bownas Smith, Lincolnshire Regiment
Colonel Alain Chartier Joly de Lotbinière, 
Temp Colonel Thomas Sinclair, MD , Army Medical Service
Lieutenant-Colonel and Brevet Colonel Philip Rynd Robertson , Scottish Rifles
Lieutenant-Colonel and Brevet Colonel William Thwaites, Royal Artillery
Lieutenant-Colonel and Brevet Colonel Thomas Angus Tancred, Royal Artillery
Lieutenant-Colonel and Brevet Colonel Webb Gillman, Royal Artillery
Lieutenant-Colonel and Brevet Colonel Archibald Rice Cameron, Royal Highlanders
Major and Brevet Colonel Travers Edward Clarke, Royal Inniskilling Fusiliers
Major and Brevet Colonel Charles Harington Harington, Liverpool Regiment
Major and Brevet Colonel John Humphrey Davidson, King's Royal Rifle Corps
Lieutenant-Colonel and Brevet Colonel John Theodosius Burnett-Stuart, Rifle Brigade
Lieutenant-Colonel and Brevet Colonel George Edward Pereira,  
Lieutenant-Colonel Frederick Gustav Lewis, London Regiment
Lieutenant-Colonel Reginald Ford, Army Service Corps
Lieutenant-Colonel William John Napier, Royal Artillery
Lieutenant-Colonel Edwin Thomas Fairweather Birrell,  MB, Royal Army Medical Corps, Australian Imperial Force
Colonel James Gordon Legge, Council of Defence, Commonwealth of Australia
Major-General John Burton Forster
Surgeon-General William Wallace Kenny, MB  
Honorary Colonel Alfred Ernest Queripel, late Advanced Vehicle Depot
Colonel Peter Henry Hammond 
Lieutenant-Colonel and Brevet-Colonel Stephen Dickson Rainsford, late Royal Artillery 
Colonel John Edward Blackburn
Colonel Arthur Gillespie Churchill 
Colonel and Honorary Brigadier-General Robert Theophilus Hewitt Law, late Royal Army Ordnance Depot 
Colonel and Honorary Brigadier-General Noel Montagu Lake 
Colonel James Henry Cowan 
Colonel Samuel Arthur Einem Hickson,  
Lieutenant-Colonel and Brevet-Colonel Bertram Percy Portal, late 17th Lancers 
Colonel Henry Stopford Dawkins
Colonel Francis James Anderson
Colonel Edward North, Army Medical Service
Colonel Frederick Falkiner Minchin
Colonel Frank Herbert Horniblow
Lieutenant-Colonel and Brevet Colonel Herbert Alexander Chapman, late Royal Artillery 
Colonel Henry Lawrence Gardiner
Colonel William Cyril Minchin, Army Pay Department
Lieutenant-Colonel and Brevet Colonel Alfred Granville Balfour 
Colonel Stapylton Chapman Bates Robinson 
Colonel William Heaton Horrocks, MB, Army Medical Service
Colonel The Honourable Henry Yarde-Buller, 
Colonel Donald James MacKintosh,  MB, Army Medical Service
Colonel James O'Hara, Army Pay Department
Colonel Charles Cooper Reilly, Army Medical Service
Colonel James Thomson, MB, Army Medical Service
Colonel Arthur James Vavasor Durell, Army Pay Department
Temp. Colonel Sir Walter Roper Lawrence, 
Lieutenant-Colonel and Brevet Colonel James Rawdon Stansfeld, Royal Artillery 
Lieutenant-Colonel and Brevet Colonel Alban Randell Crofton Atkins, Army Service Corps 
Lieutenant-Colonel and Brevet Colonel George Herbert Stewart Browne, late Suffolk Regiment 
Lieutenant-Colonel and Brevet Colonel William St Colum Bland, Royal Artillery 
Surgeon Lieutenant-Colonel Peter Johnson Freyer, MD, Retired, Indian Medical Service
Lieutenant-Colonel David Edward Wood, Remount Establishment
Lieutenant-Colonel Thomas Horrocks Openshaw, Royal Army Medical Corps
Lieutenant-Colonel Harry Gilbert Barling, Royal Army Medical Corps
Lieutenant-Colonel Henry Davy, MD, Royal Army Medical Corps
Temp. Lieutenant-Colonel Sir Thomas Myles, Royal Army Medical Corps 
Temp. Lieutenant-Colonel Sir William Arbuthnot Lane, Royal Army Medical Corps 
Temp. Lieutenant-Colonel James Swain MD, Royal Army Medical Corps 
Temp. Lieutenant-Colonel William Aldren Turner, MD, Royal Army Medical Corps 
Temp. Lieutenant-Colonel Sir Berkeley George Andrew Moynihan, MB , Royal Army Medical Corps 
Temp. Lieutenant-Colonel Robert Jones, Royal Army Medical Corps 
Major and Brevet Lieutenant-Colonel Joseph Aloysius Byrne, late Royal Inniskilling Fusiliers 
Major and Brevet Lieutenant-Colonel Vernon George Waldegrave Kell, late South Staffordshire Regiment 
Colonel Charles Henry Selwyn, Indian Army
Lieutenant-Colonel Patrick Balfour Haig, MB, Indian Medical Service
Colonel Richard Joshua Cooper , retired pay
Lieutenant-Colonel and Brevet Colonel Ewen George Sinclair-MacLagan, Yorkshire Regiment
Commander Neville Frederick Jarvis Wilson, Royal Indian Marines
Colonel Patrick Hehir, Indian Medical Service
Colonel George Francis White, Royal Artillery
Lieutenant-Colonel John Constantino Gordon Longmore, Royal Army Service Corps
Major and Brevet Lieutenant-Colonel Bartholomew George Price, Royal Fusiliers
Lieutenant-Colonel Alexander Egerton Dallas, Indian Army
Lieutenant-Colonel Walter Percy Lionel Davies, Royal Artillery
Lieutenant-Colonel Herbert William Studd, Coldstream Guards
Colonel (temporary Brigadier-General) Herbert Southey Neville White , Royal Marine Light Infantry.

Canadian Forces
Colonel Herbert Stanley Birkett, Canadian Army Medical Corps
Colonel James Alexander Roberts, Canadian Army Medical Corps
Lieutenant-Colonel Patrick Joseph Daly, Canadian Infantry
Lieutenant-Colonel John Edward Leckie, Canadian Infantry

New Zealand Force
Colonel Sir Andrew Hamilton Russell, 
Colonel Robert Logan, New Zealand Staff Corps

Civil Division
The Honourable Theo Russell, Private Secretary to the Secretary of State for Foreign Affairs
Colonel John George Stewart-Murray, Duke of Atholl,  Scottish Horse (Yeomanry)
Lieutenant-Colonel Alfred Ernest le Rossignol, London Electrical Engineers
Lieutenant-Colonel Ralph Edward Lyon, 2nd South Midland Brigade, Royal Field Artillery, Lieutenant-Colonel and Honorary Colonel, retired, Territorial Force
Lieutenant-Colonel George Savile Foljambe, Nottinghamshire and Derbyshire Regiment Territorial Force Reserve
Lieutenant-Colonel William Henry Stott, The King's (Liverpool Regiment) Territorial Force Reserve, Military Member, West Lancashire Territorial Force Association
Charles Robert Whorwood Adeane, President and chairman, Cambridgeshire and Isle of Ely Territorial Force Association, His Majesty's Lieutenant for Cambridgeshire
Colonel John McAusland Denny, Honorary Colonel, Argyll and Sutherland Highlanders (Territorial Force), chairman, Dumbartonshire Territorial Force Association
Lieutenant-Colonel Henry Mellish, late Major, Nottinghamshire and Derbyshire Regiment, Territorial Force, chairman, Nottinghamshire Territorial Force Association
Major John Murray Reddie, retired pay, Reserve of Officers, Secretary, Worcestershire Territorial Force Association
Honorary Major-General Charles Gilchrist Jeans, retired, late Army Ordnance Department
Honorary Major-General Thomas Preston Battersby, Inspector of Army Ordnance Services
Brevet Colonel Arthur William Forbes, Embarkation Commandant
Temporary Brigadier-General Albert Sydney Collard, Director of Inland Waterways and Docks
Colonel Herbert Vaughan Kent, late Royal Engineers, assistant director of Fortifications and Works
Colonel Thomas Elliott Carte, late Royal Artillery, assistant director of Artillery
Colonel Walter MacAdam, late Royal Engineers, assistant director of Fortifications and Works
Brevet Lieutenant-Colonel Philip William Temple Hale Wortham, Chief Inspector of Equipment and Stores, Army Ordnance Department
Henry William Thomas Bowyear, Chief, Charity Commissioner
Henry Fountain, Assistant Secretary, Commercial Department, Board of Trade
Alfred Thomas Davies, Permanent Secretary, Welsh Department Board of Education
Lieutenant-Colonel Ernest Dunlop Swinton, Assistant Secretary, Committee of Imperial Defence
John Thomas Davies, Private Secretary to the Prime Minister and First Lord of the Treasury
Franklyn Lewis Turner, Private Secretary to the President of the Local Government Board
Frederick George Augustus Butler , Principal Clerk, Colonial Office
Philip Hanson, Director of Contracts, Ministry of Munitions
Sigmund Dannreuther, Director of Finance, Ministry of Munitions
Colonel Louis Charles Jackson, Controller Trench Warfare Division, Department of Design, Ministry of Munitions
William Haldane Porter, Home Office
Graeme Thomson, Director of Transports, Admiralty
John Temple, Esq. (of Warrington).

The Most Exalted Order of the Star of India

Knight Commander (KCSI)

Claude Hamilton Archer Hill, an Ordinary Member of the Council of the Governor-General
His Highness Raja Malhar Rao Baba Saheb Puar, Chief of Dewas (Junior Branch), Central India
His Highness Maharaja Jitendra Narayan Bhup Bahadur, of Cooch Behar, Bengal
His Highness Jam Shri Ranjitsinhji Vibhaji, Jam Saheb of Nawanagar, Kathiawar, Bombay Presidency
His Highness Raj Ganshyamsinhji Ajitsinhji, Raj Saheb of Dhrangadhra, Kathiawar Bombay Presidency
Lieutenant-Colonel Sir Francis Edward Younghusband,  LLD DSc, Indian Political Department (retired)
Sir Theodore Morison, lately a Member of the Council of India
Major-General George Macaulay Kirkpatrick, Chief of the Indian General Staff
Major-General Robert Charles Ochiltree Stuart, Director-General of Ordnance in India

Honorary Knight Commander
Sir Bhim Shumshere Jung Bahadur Rana, Commander-in-Chief in Nepal

Companion (CSI)
Richard Burn, Indian Civil Service, Chief Secretary to the Government of the United Provinces and Oudh, and a Member of the Council of the Lieutenant-Governor for making Laws and Regulations
Godfrey Butler Hunter Fell, Indian Civil Service, Financial adviser to the Government of India in the Military Finance Department
Lieutenant-Colonel Cecil Kaye, Indian Army, Deputy Chief Censor in India
John Henry Kerr, Indian Civil Service, Chief Secretary to the Government of Bengal, and an Additional Member of the Council of the Governor for making Laws and Regulations
Colonel Wyndham Charles Knight, Indian Army, Commanding, Bombay Brigade

The Most Distinguished Order of Saint Michael and Saint George

Knight Grand Cross of the Order of St Michael and St George (GCMG)
Sir George Vandeleur Fiddes, Permanent Under-Secretary of State for the Colonies

Knight Commander of the Order of St Michael and St George (KCMG)
Honorary Major-General James Melville Babington, Colonel, 16th Lancers
Major-General Sir Alfred William Lambart Bayly, 
Surgeon-General George Deane Bourke, 
Colonel John Thomas Carter, Army Pay Department
Francis Drummond Percy Chaplin, Administrator of Southern Rhodesia
The Honourable Jacobus Arnoldus Combrinck Graaff, Minister without Portfolio and Member of the Senate of the Union of South Africa
Surgeon-General Richard William Ford,  
The Honourable William Howard Hearst, Premier of the Province of Ontario
Colonel Maurice Percy Cue Holt, Army Medical Service
Major-General George Mark Watson Macdonogh,  
The Honourable Albert Edward Kemp, Minister of Militia and Defence, Dominion of Canada 
Major-General Sir Thomas Lethbridge Napier Morland,  
The Honourable George John Robert Murray, LLM, Lieutenant-Governor and Chief Justice of the Supreme Court of South Australia
Arthur Robert Peel, His Majesty's Envoy Extraordinary and Minister Plenipotentiary to the United States of Brazil
Colonel Samuel Augustus Pethebridge, Australian Force
Lieutenant-General Sir William Pulteney Pulteney,  
Honorary Major-General Robert Pringle, 
Colonel Sir John Steevens,  
Major-General Sir Thomas D'Oyly Snow,  
Francis Watts, Imperial Commissioner of Agriculture for the West Indies

Honorary Knight Commander
Monsieur Charles de Rocca Serra, Legal Adviser to the Egyptian Ministry of Finance

Companion of the Order of St Michael and St George (CMG)
Lieutenant-Colonel Arthur Russell Aldridge,  MB, Royal Army Medical Corps
Lieutenant-Colonel James Howard Adolphus Annesley, 
Lieutenant-Colonel Alexander George Arbuthnot, Royal Field Artillery
Colonel Edwin Henry de Vere Atkinson, 
Major Andrew Aytoun, late Argyll & Sutherland Highlanders
Lieutenant-Colonel Norman Bruce Bainbridge, Army Ordnance Depot
Lieutenant-Colonel and Brevet Colonel FitzGerald Muirson Banister, Royal Field Artillery
Lieutenant-Colonel Harold Percy Waller Barrow, Royal Army Medical Corps 
Lieutenant-Colonel William Belk, late Dragoon Guards
Rev. John Turnbull Bird, MA, Royal Army Chaplains' Department
Lieutenant-Colonel John Campbell Lament Black, Army Service Corps
Lieutenant-Colonel Everard McLeod Blair, Royal Engineers
Lieutenant-Colonel Harry Simonds de Brett, Royal Artillery
Lieutenant-Colonel Christopher Brooke, Yorkshire Light Infantry
Lieutenant-Colonel Harry Edwin Bruce Bruce-Porter, Royal Army Medical Corps 
Lieutenant-Colonel and Brevet Colonel Charles Edward Dutton Budworth, 
Major-General Benjamin Burton, 
Lieutenant-Colonel Ferberd Richard Buswell, Royal Army Medical Corps
Major and Brevet Lieutenant-Colonel Frederick Joseph Byrne, late Connaught Rangers
Major and Brevet Lieutenant-Colonel Charles Lionel Kirwan Campbell, Lancers
Colonel Duncan Campbell Carter 
Lieutenant-Colonel Charles Watson Clark, Royal Garrison Artillery
Lieutenant-Colonel Henry Hercules Cobbe, Indian Army
Lieutenant-Colonel and Brevet Colonel Charles Edward Coghill, Royal Artillery
Honorary Lieutenant-Colonel John Dewar Cormack, General List
Colonel Edward Reginald Courtenay,  
Lieutenant-Colonel Robert Annesley Craig, Royal Artillery 
Colonel Thomas Daly, Royal Army Medical Corps
Major and Brevet Lieutenant-Colonel Warburton Edward Davies, Rifle Brigade 
Lieutenant-Colonel Henry Davies, Army Service Corps
Honorary Colonel Archibald Campbell Douglas Dick, Argyll and Sutherland Highlanders
Colonel Arthur John William Dowell
Major George William Dowell, North Lancashire Regiment
Lieutenant-Colonel Francis Ferguson Duffus, Army Service Corps
Temp Lieutenant-Colonel Herbert Lightfoot Eason, MD, Royal Army Medical Corps
Colonel FitzJames Maine Edwards, Indian Army
Temp Colonel Thomas Crisp English, MB , Army Medical Service
Colonel Henry Joseph Everett,  
Major and Brevet Lieutenant-Colonel Cecil Fane, Lancers, attd. Nottinghamshire & Derbyshire Regiment
Lieutenant-Colonel Reginald Winnington Fanshawe, Army Pay Department
Lieutenant-Colonel Wemyss Gawne Cunningham Feilden, Army Pay Department
Colonel Henry Thomas Fenwick, Middlesex Regiment
Lieutenant-Colonel John David Ferguson, Royal Army Medical Corps
Major and Brevet Lieutenant-Colonel Hugh Clifford Fernyhough, Army Ordnance Depot
Lieutenant-Colonel Alexander William Frederick, Lord Saltoun, retired, late Grenadier Guards
Lieutenant-Colonel Henry Francis Fraser, Lancers 
Colonel George Arthur French
Lieutenant-Colonel Robert Strickland Hannay Fuhr, Royal Army Medical Corps 
Major Harry Townsend Fulton, Indian Army
Major and Brevet Lieutenant-Colonel William James Theodore Glasgow, Royal West Surrey Regiment
Colonel Charles Godby
Lieutenant-Colonel Herbert Gordon, Leicestershire Regiment
Colonel William Lewis Gray, MB, Royal Army Medical Corps
Lieutenant-Colonel Henry Guy Fulljames Savage Gregson, Army Ordnance Depot
Colonel Reginald Parker Grove
Major George Lovell Gulland, Royal Army Medical Corps 
Major Sir Charles Vere Gunning, Remount Service, late Durham Light Infantry 
The Right Rev. Bishop Llewellyn Henry Gwynne, DD, Deputy Chaplain General 
Colonel Neil Wolseley Haig
Lieutenant-Colonel Percy Douglas Hamilton, Royal Artillery
Colonel Arthur Clifton Hansard
Major and Brevet Lieutenant-Colonel Kenneth Edward Haynes, Royal Artillery 
Lieutenant-Colonel Edward Sidney Herbert, Royal Highlanders, employed Egyptian Army 
Colonel Henry Cecil de la Montague Hill, 
Colonel Edmund Arthur Ponsonby Hobday, Royal Field Artillery
Temp Lieutenant-Colonel Gordon Morgan Holmes, MD, Royal Army Medical Corps
Major Bertram Hopkinson, Officers Training Corps 
Major-General Henry Byron Jeffreys,  
Lieutenant-Colonel Arthur Stawell Jenour, Royal Garrison Artillery
Colonel Richard Orlando Kellett
Major Tom Kelly, Royal Engineers
Lieutenant-Colonel Arthur Durham Kirby, Royal Artillery
Colonel Henry Thomas Knaggs, MB, Army Medical Service
Lieutenant-Colonel John William Fraser Lament, Royal Horse Artillery
Colonel Herbert Edward Bruce Lane
Colonel Robert St. Clair Lecky,  
Major John Stewart Liddell, 
Temp. Lieutenant-Colonel John Hall Seymour Lloyd, Special List
Temp. Honorary Lieutenant-Colonel John Lynn-Thomas, Royal Army Medical Corps
Major and Brevet Lieutenant-Colonel Duncan Sayre MacInnes, Royal Engineers 
Colonel Ernest William Stuart King Maconchy, Retired
Major Lord Robert William Orlando Manners, King's Royal Rifle Corps
Lieutenant-Colonel Thomas Edward Marshall, Royal Artillery
Lieutenant-Colonel and Brevet Colonel William George Massy
Lieutenant-Colonel Laurence Lockhart Maxwell, Indian Army
Major and Brevet Lieutenant-Colonel Robert Henry McVittie, Army Ordnance Depot
Major Lionel Charles Patrick Milman, Royal Artillery 
Colonel Frederick James Morgan, Army Medical Service
Temp Major Sir William Thomson Morison, Army Ordnance Depot
Major and Brevet Lieutenant-Colonel William Patrick Eric Newbigging, Manchester Regiment
Colonel Foster Reuss Newland, MB, Army Medical Service
Lieutenant-Colonel Cuthbert Cecil Noott, Royal Artillery 
Colonel Robert Arthur Nugent,  
Lieutenant-Colonel John Spencer Ollivant, Royal Artillery
Colonel William Henry Onslow,  
Temp Lieutenant-Colonel Hercules Arthur Pakenham, Royal Irish Rifles
Lieutenant-Colonel Herbert Chidgey Brine Payne, Army Pay Department
Temp. Lieutenant-Colonel George Sherwin Hooke Pearson, late Northamptonshire Regiment
Colonel and Honorary Brigadier-General Cooper Penrose, 
Major-General Arthur Pole Penton,  
Major Harold Franz Passawer Percival, Army Service Corps 
Lieutenant-Colonel and Brevet Colonel Cecil Edward Pereira, Coldstream Guards
Lieutenant-Colonel Thomas Richmond Phillips, Royal Garrison Artillery
Lieutenant-Colonel and Brevet Colonel William Harry Percival Plomer, Royal Irish Fusiliers
Colonel Herbert Innes Pocock, Royal Army Medical Corps
Lieutenant-Colonel Frederick Cuthbert Poole, 
Lieutenant-Colonel Gerald Robert Poole, Royal Marine Artillery
Lieutenant-Colonel William Wippell Pope, late Royal Army Medical Corps 
Major and Brevet Lieutenant-Colonel Harry Lionel Pritchard, Royal Engineers
Lieutenant-Colonel David William Purdon, Indian Army
Colonel Robert Maximilian Rainey-Robinson , Indian Army
Major Harry Stuart Ravenhill, Army Pay Department
Lieutenant-Colonel and Brevet Colonel Claude Rawnsley, Army Service Corps
Captain Ambrose St. Quintin Ricardo, 
Major and Brevet Lieutenant-Colonel Rupert Farquhar Riley, Yorkshire Light Infantry 
Major Walter Leslie Rocke, Wiltshire Regiment
Lieutenant-Colonel and Brevet Colonel Cecil Francis Romer, Royal Dublin Fusiliers
Major-General Richard Matthews Ruck, 
Major and Brevet Lieutenant-Colonel Richard Tyler Russell, Army Ordnance Depot 
Lieutenant-Colonel George Herbert Sanders, Royal Artillery
Colonel William Henry Savage, Indian Army
Lieutenant-Colonel George Edward Sayce, West Lancashire Division, Royal Engineers
Colonel Bertal Hopton Scott, Royal Army Medical Corps
Lieutenant-Colonel Edwin Charles Seaman, Royal Engineers 
Lieutenant-Colonel John Shakespear, Indian Army
Lieutenant-Colonel Herbert Cecil Sheppard, Royal Artillery
Temp Major John Sherwood-Kelly, Norfolk Regiment
Major William Shirley, London Regiment 
Colonel Cameron Deane Shute,  
Colonel George Hamilton Sim, 
Colonel Hugh Montgomerie Sinclair, 
Lieutenant-Colonel Lionel Fergus Smith, MB, Royal Army Medical Corps
Colonel Charles Wyndham Somerset, Indian Army
Lieutenant-Colonel and Brevet Colonel Alexander Sprot
Lieutenant-Colonel George Bradshaw Stanistreet, MB, Royal Army Medical Corps 
Lieutenant-Colonel Herbert Stewart McCance Stanuell
Temp. Major Albert Gerald Stern, Machine Gun Corps
Major and Brevet Lieutenant-Colonel Alexander Gavin Stevenson, Royal Engineers
Lieutenant-Colonel and Brevet Colonel James Wilfrid Stirling, Royal Field Artillery
Lieutenant-Colonel Arthur Uniacke Stockley, Royal Artillery
Colonel and Honorary Brigadier-General Francis Gleadows Stone, 
Lieutenant-Colonel and Brevet Colonel Casimir Cartwright Van Straubenzee, Royal Artillery
Colonel Harald George Carlos Swayne, Royal Engineers
Major Walter Conover Symon, late Royal Artillery 
Lieutenant-Colonel Frank Albert Symons,  MB, Royal Army Medical Corps
Lieutenant-Colonel and Brevet-Colonel Haydon d'Aubrey Potenger Taylor
Lieutenant-Colonel Henry Melville Thomas, Royal Field Artillery
Lieutenant-Colonel Charles Campbell Todd, Army Pay Department
Lieutenant-Colonel Francis William Towsey, West Yorkshire Regiment
Colonel and Honorary Brigadier-General Charles Prideaux Triscott, 
Lieutenant-Colonel and Brevet Colonel Courtney Vor Trower
Lieutenant-Colonel George Edward Twiss, late Royal Army Medical Corps
Lieutenant-Colonel Allan Vesey Ussher, Scottish Rifles
Colonel Bernard Rowland Ward
Temp. Brigadier-General Fabian Arthur Goulstone Ware, Special List
Major Harold Farnell Watson, Lancashire Fusiliers
Colonel Thomas du Bedat Whaite, MB, Royal Army Medical Corps
Lieutenant-Colonel and Brevet Colonel William Douglas Whatman, attached Remount Service
Lieutenant-Colonel Hugh Davie White-Thomson, Royal Artillery
Lieutenant-Colonel and Brevet Colonel Weir de Lancey Williams, Hampshire Regiment
Lieutenant-Colonel and Brevet Colonel Edward Henry Willis, Royal Artillery
Lieutenant-Colonel Frank Walter Wilson, Royal Army Veterinary Corps
Temp Major Nathaniel Wilson, 
Lieutenant-Colonel Francis Adrian Wilson, Royal Field Artillery
Lieutenant-Colonel Samuel Henry Withers, MB, Royal Army Medical Corps
Lieutenant-Colonel Frederic Woodall, Army Pay Department
Major and Brevet Lieutenant-Colonel Charles Richard Woodroffe, Royal Artillery
Colonel Robert Wallace Wright, MB, Royal Army Medical Corps
Lieutenant-Colonel Arthur Davidson Young, late Royal Artillery

Australian Forces
Colonel Robert Murray McCheyne Anderson, Staff, Australian Imperial Force 
Lieutenant-Colonel Charles Henry Brand, 
Lieutenant-Colonel Alfred Button, Australian Army Medical Service
Colonel Harold Edward Elliott
Colonel John Keatly Forsyth
Lieutenant Colonel Thomas Griffiths,  Australian Imperial Force, Administrative Headquarters
Captain George Clifford Miller Hall, late Royal Engineers, Australian Imperial Force 
Lieutenant-Colonel James Heane, 
Lieutenant-Colonel James Lyon Johnston, Australian Imperial Force
Lieutenant Colonel Thomas William Jolliffe, Australian Imnperial Force
Colonel Harry Beauchamp Lassetter, Commonwealth Military Forces
Colonel George Leonard Lee, Commonwealth Military Forces
Colonel (temporary Brigadier-General) Gustave Ramaciotti, Commonwealth Military Forces
Colonel (temporary Brigadier-General) John Staniey, Retired List, Commonwealth Military Forces
Major Arthur Borlase Stevens, Australian Infantry
Colonel Ernest Townshend Wallack, Australian Imperial Force
Colonel Robert Ernest Williams, Commonwealth Military Forces

Canadian Forces
Lieutenant-Colonel Maurice Alexander, Canadian Local Forces
Lieutenant-Colonel Edward Charles Hart, Canadian Army Medical Corps
Lieutenant-Colonel Garnet Burke Hughes, 
Colonel Huntly Douglas Brodie Ketchen
Lieutenant-Colonel Edward Whipple Bancroft Morrison, 
Colonel George Patterson Murphy, Canadian Local Forces
Lieutenant-Colonel Robert Rennie,  
Lieutenant-Colonel James George Ross, Canadian Local Forces
Honorary Colonel Rev. Richard Henry Steacy, Chaplain Service, Canadian Local Forces

New Zealand Forces
Colonel Edward Walter Clervaux Chaytor,  
Colonel the Honourable William Edward Collins, MB , New Zealand Medical Corps

Colonies, Protectorates, etc.
Edmond Howard Lacam Gorges, Administrator of the Protectorate of South West Africa
Robert Johnstone, Assistant Colonial Secretary, Island of Jamaica 
Francis William Major, Chief of Customs, East Africa Protectorate 
Captain Edward Harrington Martin, Royal Canadian Navy, Captain-Superintendent of the Halifax Dockyard, Nova Scotia 
The Honourable James Mitchell, Minister for Railways, Water Supply and Industries, State of Western Australia 
Arthur Sampson Pagden, Controller of Revenue, Island of Ceylon 
Leonard Rodway, Government Botanist, State of Tasmania 
Charles Lane Sansom, Principal Medical Officer, Federated Malay States 
Claud Severn, Colonial Secretary of the Colony of Hong Kong
Frederick Spire, Provincial Commissioner, Uganda Protectorate

Diplomatic and Overseas Residents
William Andrew Betts, MD, Director of the Municipal and Local Committees of Egypt
Ronald Hugh Campbell, of the Foreign Office
Arthur Morison Chalmers, His Majesty's Consul-General at Yokohama
Horace Dickinson Nugent, His Majesty's Consul-General at Chicago
Esmond Ovey, First Secretary to His Majesty's Legation at Christiania
Leander Gaspard Roussin, Financial Secretary to the Minister of Finance, Cairo 
Edward William Paget Thurstan, His Majesty's Consul-General and Chargé d'Affaires at Mexico City
The Honourable Charles Henry Tufton, of the Foreign Office
John Warnock, MD, Director of Lunatic Asylums, Egypt

The Most Eminent Order of the Indian Empire

Knight Commander (KCIE)
Robert Bailey Clegg, Indian Civil Service, First Member, Board of Revenue, Madras, and an Additional Member of the Council of the Governor for making Laws and Regulations
Henry Wheeler, Indian Civil Service, lately Secretary to the Government of India in the Home Department

Honorary Knight Commander
Juddha Shumsher Jang Bahadur Rana, Commanding General of the Southern Division in Nepal

Companion (CIE)
William Alexander, Traffic Department, Great Indian Peninsula Railway, Bombay
Victor Bayley, Assistant Secretary, Railway Board, and Superintendent of Munitions, India
Stephen Montagu Burrows, Secretary to the Oxford Delegacy for Oriental Students
Lieutenant-Colonel Hugh Alan Cameron, Royal Engineers, Traffic Manager, North-Western Railway of India
Percy Albert Churchward, managing director, Bank of Rangoon, Burma
William Strachan Coutts, Indian Civil Service, Registrar of the Patna High Court, Bihar and Orissa
Rao Bahadur Appaji Ganesh Dandekar, Honorary Magistrate, Thana District, Bombay
Major William Edmund Ritchie Dickson, Royal Engineers, General Staff Officer, 1st Grade, Army Headquarters, India
Lieutenant-Colonel John Herbert Dickson, Indian Army, Supply and Transport Corps, assistant director of Supplies and Transport, Bombay
Commander William Ramsay Binny Douglas, Royal Indian Marine, Senior Military Transport Officer, Bombay
Lieutenant-Colonel John Farmer, Indian Civil Veterinary Department, Chief Superintendent, Punjab
Charles Francis Fitch, of Mussoorie, United Provinces of Agra and Oudh
John Dillon Flynn, Goods Superintendent, Great Indian Peninsula Railway, Wadi Bunder, Bombay
Major Edward Scott Gillett, Army Veterinary Corps, Personal Assistant to the Director-General, Army Remount-Department, India
William Robert Gourlay, Indian Civil Service, Private Secretary to the Governor of Bengal
Captain Ralph Edwin Hotchkin Griffith, Indian Army, Political Department, Assistant Political Agent, North-West Frontier Province
Francis Sylvester Grimston, Superintendent, Rifle Factory, Ishapore
Philip Joseph Hartog, lately Secretary to Departmental Committees on the Organisation of Oriental Studies in London
Major Westwood Norman Hay, Indian Army, Commandant, Zhob Militia, Baluchistan
Lieutenant-Colonel James Graham Hojel, MB, Indian Medical Service, Officer Commanding, Lady Hardinge War Hospital, Bombay
Robert Erskine Holland, Indian Civil Service, Deputy Secretary (Political) Foreign and Political Department, Government of India
Khan Bahadur Muhammad Aziz-ud-Din Husain, Sahib Bahadur , Collector of South Arcot, Madras Presidency, and Special Agent, French Settlement, and Political Agent for Pondicherry
William John Keith, Indian Civil Service, Revenue Secretary to the Government of Burma, and a Member of the Council of the Lieutenant-Governor for making Laws and Regulations
Lieutenant-Colonel Norborne Kirby, Royal Engineers, Officiating Commanding Royal Engineer, 6th (Poona) Divisional Area
Arthur James Warburton Kitchin, Indian Civil Service, Deputy Commissioner, Lyallpur, Punjab
Temporary Major Robert Scarth Farquhar Macrae, Indian Police, Controller of Native Craft, Mesopotamia Expeditionary Force, and lately Commissioner of Police, Baroda State
Henry Miller, a Member of the Council of the Chief Commissioner of Assam for making Laws and Regulations
Diwan Bahadur Lala Bisheshar Nath, late Diwan of the Rajgarh State, Central India
Major William Edmund Pye, 98th Infantry, Recruiting Officer for Jats and Hindustani Musalmans
Major Sidney Mervyn Rice, 64tth Pioneers, Deputy Assistant Quartermaster-General, Army Headquarters, India
Sardar Bahadur Bhagat Singh, Wazir of Poonch, Kashmir (posthumous)
Major Claude Bayfield Stokes, 3rd Skinners Horse, General Staff Officer, 2nd Grade, Army Headquarters, India
Charles Augustus Tegart, Indian Police, Additional Deputy Commissioner of Police, Calcutta
Captain Drury St. Aubyn Wake, 
Captain Edmund Walter, Indian Army, Supply and Transport Corps, Deputy Assistant Director of Transport, Army Headquarters, India
Lieutenant Duncan William Wilson, Indian Army Reserve of Officers, Assistant Embarkation Staff Officer, Bombay
Lieutenant Edgar Clements Withers, Royal Indian Marine, Intelligence Officer, Persian Gulf
Morris Yudlevitz Young, MB, Medical Officer at the Oil Fields, Persian Gulf
Lieutenant-Colonel Henry Alfred Young, Royal Artillery, Director of Ordnance Inspection, India

Imperial Order of the Crown of India 

Marie Adelaide Freeman-Thomas, Baroness Willingdon, wife of Sir Freeman Freeman-Thomas, Baron Willingdon , Governor of the Presidency of Bombay

The Royal Victorian Order

Knight Grand Cross of the Royal Victorian Order (GCVO)
Alexander Hugh Bruce, Baron Balfour of Burleigh, 
Luke Henry White, Baron Annaly, Permanent Lord-in-waiting to His Majesty

Knight Commander of the Royal Victorian Order (KCVO)
Richard Farrer Herschell, Baron Herschell, Lord-in-Waiting to His Majesty
The Honourable John Hubert Ward, Extra Equerry to His Majesty and Equerry to Her Majesty Queen Alexandra
The Honourable Alexander Nelson Hood, Treasurer to Her Majesty the Queen
Sir Robert William Burnet, Physician to His Majesty's Household

Commander of the Royal Victorian Order (CVO)
The Honourable John William Fortescue, Librarian to His Majesty
Sir Walter Parratt, Master of the Music to His Majesty
Sir Cecil Harcourt-Smith, Director and Secretary, Victoria and Albert Museum
The Rev. Mortimer Egerton Kennedy, Chaplain-in-Ordinary to His Majesty, and Chaplain to His Majesty's Legation, Copenhagen
Robert Addison Smith, 
John George Griffiths, Honorary Secretary, King Edward's Hospital Fund for London

Member of the Royal Victorian Order, 4th class (MVO)
Walter Galpin Alcock,  MusDoc. Organist of the Chapels Royal
Ernest Alfred Bendall, Examiner of Plays
Francis Edward Raikes, King's Foreign Service Messenger

Member of the Royal Victorian Order, 5th class (MVO)
Joseph Andrew Gardiner
Albert Cox Legg

Royal Red Cross

First Class (RRC)
C. Alcock, Principal Matron, Territorial Force Nursing Service (T.F.N.S.), 5th Southern General Hospital, Southsea
M. L. T. Babb, Sister, Queen Alexandra's Imperial Military Nursing Service Reserve (Q.A.I.M.N.S.R.), Military Hospital, Dover
A. I. Baird, Sister in charge, Q.A.I.M.N.S.R.
M. Banfield, Matron, Q.A.I.M.N.S.R., Lord Derby War Hospital, Warrington
E. Barber, Sister, Acting Matron, Queen Alexandra's Imperial Military Nursing Service (Q.A.I.M.N.S.)
M. Bayldon, Matron, T.F.N.S., 4th Northern General Hospital, Lincoln
I. C. Bennett, Matron, Met. Hospital, Kingsland Road, London
H. Bigg, Matron, Charing Cross Hospital
C. T. Bilton, Sister, Acting Matron, Q.A.I.M.N.S.
A. M. Bird, Matron, Great Northern Central Hospital
L. Bradburne, Matron, Meath Auxiliary Hospital, Dublin
S. A. Brown, Matron, Q.A.I.M.N.S.R., Dartford War Hospital 
A. C. G. Buller, Administrator, Grouped Auxiliary Hospitals, Exeter
M. Carruthers, Matron, Q.A.I.M.N.S.R., Pavilion and York Place Hospitals, Brighton
L. O. Carter, Matron, T.F.N.S., 2nd Eastern General Hospital, Brighton
H. Casault, Matron, Canadian Nursing Service
A. E. Cashin, Sister, Q.A.I.M.N.S.R.
M. H. Cave, Matron, Bury and West Suffolk Hospital, Bury St. Edmunds
E. C. Cheetham, Matron, Q.A.I.M.N.S.
M. Clements, Sister, Acting Matron, Q.A.I.M.N.S.
L. A. Cowley, Sister, Q.A.I.M.N.S.R.
E. R. Creagh, Matron, South African Nursing Service
R. E. Crowdy , Principal Commandant, Voluntary Aid Detachment, France
L. E. Cushon, Principal Matron, British Red Cross Hospital, Netley
C. L. Cusins, Lady Superintendent, Queen Alexandra's Medical Nursing Service India (Q.A.M.N.S.I.)
S. N. Daly, Sister, Acting Matron, Q.A.I.M.N.S.
I. Davidson, Matron, Edinburgh War Hospital, Bangour
G. T. Davis, Matron, 1st Western General Hospital, Fazakerley, Liverpool
E. M. Denne, Sister, Acting Matron, Q.A.I.M.N.S.
E. Dodds, Matron, Bethnal Green Military Hospital, Cambridge Heath
A. Dowbiggin, Matron, Military Hospital, Edmonton
E. Eddison, Matron, Royal City of Dublin Auxiliary Hospital
D. Finch, Matron, University College Hospital, London
M. M. Finlay, Matron, Australian Army Nursing Service
E. E. Fletcher, Matron, 2nd Western General Hospital, Manchester
G. Fletcher, Matron, Q.A.I.M.N.S., Richmond Military Hospital, Grove Road, Richmond, Surrey
K. E. Flower, acting Sister, Nursing Staff of Civil Hospitals
M. A. Foggett, Matron, Bradford War Hospital, Yorkshire
J. I. Fortune, Sister, Acting Matron, T.F.N.S.
A. M. Gilmore, Senior Nursing Sister, Q.A.M.N.S.I.
M. Graham, Matron, Australian Army Nursing Service
H. Haddow, Assistant Matron, T.F.N.S.
G. R. Hale, Matron, Endell Street Military Hospital, London
M. S. Hamer, Matron, Norfolk War Hospital, Thorpe, Norwich
H. Hannath, Matron, T.F.N.S., 5th Northern General Hospital, Leicester
H. Hare, Matron, Q.A.I.M.N.S., Military Hospital, Grantham
M. L. Harris, Sister, Q.A.I.M.N.S., Military Hospital, Felixstowe
A. J. Hartley, Matron, Canadian Army Nursing Service
L. V. Haughton, Q.A.I.M.N.S., Nursing Board and Matron, late Guy's Hospital, London
Miss Hezlett, Matron, Richmond Auxiliary Hospital, Dublin
P. Hill, Matron, Adelaide Auxiliary Hospital, Dublin
K. H. M. Holmes, Staff Nurse, Acting Sister, Q.A.I.M.N.S.
L. M. Hubley, Matron, Canadian Army Nursing Service
G. Hughes, Staff Nurse (Acting Matron), Q.A.I.M.N.S.
E. T. Jacques, Sister, Q.A.I.M.N.S.R.
E. W. Jayne, Sister, Q.A.I.M.N.S.R., Barnet War Hospital, Hertfordshire
R. L. Jones, Officers Hospital, Dublin
A. M. Kellett, Matron, Australian Army Nursing Service
E. Kerr, Sister in charge, T.F.N.S.
A. E. Kerslake, Matron, T.F.N.S., 1st Southern General Hospital, Edgbaston, Birmingham
F. Knowles, Matron, T.F.N.S., 4th London General Hospital, King's College, London
M. C. Laing, Sister, T.F.N.S.
E. M. Lang, Sister, Acting Matron, Q.A.I.M.N.S.
A. Lloyd-Still, Principal Matron, T.F.N.S., 5th London General Hospital, St. Thomas Hospital, London
A. Macdonald, Acting Matron, T.F.N.S., 1st Eastern General Hospital, Cambridge
E. Macfarlane, Sister, T.F.N.S., Malta
L. E. Mackay, Sister, Acting Matron, Q.A.I.M.N.S.
J. P. MacLeod, Matron, Nursing Service Reserve, Northumberland War Hospital, Gosforth, Newcastle upon Tyne
F. Macpherson , Q.A.I.M.N.S., acting Matron, Military Hospital, Sutton Veny
M. O'C. McCreery, Sister, Q.A.I.M.N.S., Military Hospital, Cork
M. McDougall, Staff Nurse, T.F.N.S., Malta
M. McGivney, Matron, Mater Misericordiae Hospital, Dublin
A. McLeod, Sister, Q.A.I.M.N.S.R.
A. Mclntosh, Matron, St. Bartholomew's Hospital, London
C. Metcalfe, Matron, Graylingwell War Hospital, Chichester
C. W. Millar, Matron, T.F.N.S., 2nd Scottish General Hospital, Craigleith, Edinburgh
M. S. Milne, Matron, Q.A.I.M.N.S.R.
G. E. Morgan, Matron, Middlesex Hospital, Clacton-on-Sea
M. Morgan, Matron, Q.A.I.M.N.S.R., Military Hospital, York
J. M. Murray, Sister, T.F.N.S.
V. C. Nesbitt, Matron, Canadian Army Nursing Service
A. B. Nunn, Sister, Acting Matron, Q.A.I.M.N.S.
R. Osborne, Matron, Q.A.I.M.N.S.
M. C. Parsons, Vice-chairman, Voluntary Aid Detachment, Central Selection Board, Glasgow
M. G. Parsons, Matron, American Nursing Service
B. F. Perkins, Sister, Acting Matron, Q.A.I.M.N.S.
A. M. Phillips, Matron, Dr. Steeven's Auxiliary Hospital, Dublin
M. L. Potter, Sister, Acting Matron, Q.A.I.M.N.S.
G. Preston, Matron, T.F.N.S., 1st Northern General Hospital, Armsfrong College, Newcastle upon Tyne
F. Price, Matron, New Zealand Nursing Service
M. Priestman, Matron, T.F.N.S., 4th Southern General Hospital, Plymouth
E. St. Quintin, Sister, Q.A.I.M.N.S., Kinmel Park Camp Military Hospital, Abergele
E. C. Rayside, Matron, Canadian Nursing Service
E. C. Rayside, Matron, Canadian Army Nursing Service
E. T. Richardson, Matron-in-Chief, Australian Army Nursing Service
G. Richardson, Matron, 3rd Western General Hospital, Cardiff
M. Ritchie-Thompson, Sister, Q.A.I.M.N.S.R.
K. Roscoe, Sister, Acting Matron, Q.A.I.M.N.S.
E. Russell, Matron, Canadian Nursing Service
E. F. Scott, Matron, Mill Road Auxiliary Hospital, Liverpool
K. Scott, Matron, Royal Sussex County Hospital, Brighton
K. G. F. Skinner, Sister, Acting Matron, Q.A.I.M.N.S.
F. M. Smith, Matron, T.F.N.S., 2nd Southern General Hospital, Maudlin Street, Bristol
M. E. Smith, Sister, Acting Matron, Q.A.I.M.N.S.
M. Smith, Matron, Canadian Nursing Service
C. S. Soutar, Sister, Q.A.I.M.N.S.R.
M. Steenson, Sister, Acting Matron, Q.A.I.M.N.S.
B. Stephenson, Matron, Q.A.I.M.N.S.R., Wharncliffe War Hospital, Middlewood Road, Sheffield
J. R. Stevenson, Matron, Scottish National Red Cross Hospital, Bellahouston, Glasgow
S. A. Stevenson, Matron, T.F.N.S., 3rd Northern General Hospital, Collegiate Hall, Sheffield
E. Stewart, Matron, City of London Military Hospital, Clapton, London
G. M. Stewart, Matron, Q.A.I.M.N.S.R., Northamptonshire. War Hospital, Duston, Northampton
C. G. Stronach, Sister, Acting Matron, Q.A.I.M.N.S.
C. I. K. Sunnier, Matron, Australian Army Nursing Service Reserve, Princess Christian Military Hospital, Englefield Green, Surrey
E. E. Taylor, Matron, T.F.N.S., Merryflatts War Hospital, Govan, Glasgow
E. O. Thomson, Matron, T.F.N.S., 4th Scottish General Hospital, Stobhill, Glasgow
M. E. Thomson, Sister, Acting Matron, Q.A.I.M.N.S.R.
M. M. Thorburn, Principal Matron, The Horton (County of London) War Hospital, Epsom
M. Thurston, Matron-in-Chief, New Zealand Army Nursing Service
C. A. Tisdell, Matron, Q.A.I.M.N.S.R., Stoke-on-Trent War Hospital
L. M. Toller, Sister, Q.A.I.M.N.S.
F. H. Tomlin, Matron, T.F.N.S., East Leeds War Hospital, Harehill Road, Leeds
J. N. Miles Walker, Matron, Australian Army Nursing Service
R. E. Wallace, Matron, Q.A.I.M.N.S., Southwark Military Hospital, East Dulwich Grove, London
A. Weir, Sister, Acting Matron, Q.A.I.M.N.S.
M. L. Whiffin, Matron, T.F.N.S., 2nd Northern General Hospital, Leeds
G. L. White, Matron, T.F.N.S., 3rd Southern General Hospital, Oxford
A. A. Wilson, Sister, Acting Matron, Q.A.I.M.N.S.
F. Wilson, Matron, Canadian Army Nursing Service
A. B. Wohlmann, Matron, Q.A.I.M.N.S., Malta
I. Woodford, Sister, T.F.N.S.

Second Class (ARRC)

G. Able (now Scudamore), Sister, Q.A.I.M.N.S.R., late Prees Heath Military Hospital, Salop
E Addison, Sister, Royal Sussex County Hospital, Brighton
M. Aherhe, Staff Nurse, Q.A.I.M.N.S.R., Military Hospital, Bagthorpe, Nottingham
A. D. M. Alban, Staff Nurse, Q.A.I.M.N.S., Malta
K. Aldridge, Nurse, T.F.N.S., 1st Eastern General Hospital, Cambridge
A. Alexander, Sister, Graylingwell War Hospital, Chichester
J. Alexander, Lady Superintendent and Matron, Royal Alexandra Infirmary, Paisley
M. Alexander, acting Sister, Nursing Staff of Civil Hospitals
M. Allbeury, Sister, Welsh Metropolitan War Hospital, Whitchurch, Cardiff
A. D. Allen, Sister, Canadian Army Nursing Service
W. M. Amos, acting Sister, Nursing Staff of Civil Hospitals
J. K. Amour, Matron, Sunderland Royal Infirmary
A. Anderson, Staff Nurse, Q.A.I.M.N.S.R., late Royal Victoria Hospital, Netley
C. Anderson, Sister, 1st Western General Hospital, Fazakerley, Liverpool
E. A. Arrowsmith, Sister, T.F.N.S., 1st Southern General Hospital, Edgbaston, Birmingham
L. Badger, Sister, Acting Matron, Q.A.I.M.N.S.R.
L. S. A. Ball, Staff Nurse, Australian Army Nursing Service
M. W. Bannister, Sister in charge, Q.A.I.M.N.S.R.
M. E. Barber, Nursing Sister, South African Military Nursing Service
J. Barclay, Staff Nurse, Q.A.I.M.N.S.R., Royal Herbert Hospital, Woolwich
F. M. E. Barnard, Sister in charge, Q.A.I.M.N.S.R.
P. Barnard, Sister in charge, T.F.N.S.
E. Barnes, Sister, Norfolk War Hospital, Thorpe, Norwich
E. Barrett, Staff Nurse, T.F.N.S., 3rd Scottish General Hospital, Stobhill, Glasgow
L. E. Barrow, Sister, Q.A.I.M.N.S.R.
H. M. Barry, Sister, British Red Cross Society
A. Barton, Matron, Australian Army Nursing Service
M. Barton, Sister, Q.A.I.M.N.S.
C. M. Batchdlor, acting Sister, Nursing Staff of Civil Hospitals
M. Baxter, Matron, Coulter Hospital, 5, Grosvenor Square, London
C. F. Bayley, Sister in charge, T.F.N.S.
E. M. Beamish, Sister, Q.A.I.M.N.S.R.
E. Bell, Sister, Q.A.I.M.N.S.R., Military Hospital, Ripon
E. L. Bell, Nursing Sister, Canadian Army Nursing Service
F. C. Bell, Superintending Nurse, Brigade Hospital, Newcastle
J. C. Bell, Sister, Q.A.I.M.N.S.R., Royal Herbert Hospital, Woolwich
E. F. Beloe, Matron, Q.A.I.M.N.S.R., Military Hospital, Herne Bay
 E. Bigger, Sister, Q.A.I.M.N.S.R., late Military Hospital, Tidworth
A. E. Billington, Sister, T.F.N.S., 2nd Northern General Hospital, Leeds
V. L. W. Bird, Staff Nurse, Q.A.I.M.N.S., Royal Herbert Hospital, Woolwich
E. E. Bishop, Matron, Australian Army Nursing Service
E. M. Bishop, Sister, Civilian Hospital, Reserve Military Hospital, Colchester
M. Bissett, Staff Nurse, T.F.N.S., Scottish National Red Cross Hospital, Bellahouston, Glasgow
G. J. Blacklock, Staff Nurse, Q.A.I.M.N.S.R.
M. A. C. Blair, Sister in charge, Q.A.I.M.N.S.R.
A. Blakesley, Sister, Military Hospital, Edmonton, London
F. Blakestone, Sister, Q.A.I.M.N.S.R., Royal Victoria Hospital, Netley
E. Blythe, Staff Nurse, Q.A.I.M.N.S.R.
M. Bolderstone, Sister, T.F.N.S., 3rd Scottish General Hospital, Stobhill, Glasgow
K. H. Bolton, Sister, Q.A.I.M.N.S.R., Wharncliffe War Hospital, Middlewood Road, Sheffield
G. R. Bond, Acting Sister, Q.A.I.M.N.S.R., Pavilion and York Place Hospitals, Brighton
E. Boultbee, Nursing Sister, Canadian Army Nursing Service
L. A. Bourner, Sister, T.F.N.S., 1st London General Hospital, St. Gabriel's College, Camberwell, London
E. H. Bousfield, Staff Nurse, Nursing Service Reserve, Northumberland War Hospital, Gosforth, Newcastle upon Tyne
A. J. Bowman, Matron, Q.A.I.M.N.S.R., Military Hospital, Bovington, Hampshire
E. L. Bramwell, Sister, Richmond Military Hospital, Grove Road, Richmond, Surrey
M. Brasier, Matron, British Red Cross Society
L. Brawn, Sister, Q.A.I.M.N.S.R., Malta
E. E. Bray, Sister, Q.A.I.M.N.S.R., Military Hospital, Devonport
E. M. Brooke, Sister, Q.A.I.M.N.S.R., Military Hospital, Tidworth
A. Buckley, Sister, New Zealand Nursing Service
E. Bullivant, Sister, The Queen's Hospital, Birmingham
E. D. Bullock, Assistant Matron, T.F.N.S.; 1st Southern General Hospital, Edgbaston, Birmingham
K. M. Bulman, Sister in Charge (retired list), Q.A.I.M.N.S.
S. B. Burrell, acting Sister, Nursing Staff of Civil Hospitals
W. E. Butcher, Sister, Q.A.I.M.N.S.R., Fort Pitt Military Hospital, Chatham
G. Bygrave, Sister, Graylingwell War Hospital, Chichester
D. T. Cackett, Sister in charge, Q.A.I.M.N.S.R.
M. A. Cain, Sister, Q.A.I.M.N.S.R.
M. N. Caird, Staff Nurse, Q.A.I.M.N.S.R.
C. Cameron, Nursing Sister, Canadian Nursing Service
J. C. Cameron, Staff Nurse, Q.A.I.M.N.S.R., Wharncliffe War Hospital, Middlewood Road, Sheffield
M. Cameron, Sister in charge, T.F.N.S.
F. Campbell, Staff Nurse, Q.A.I.M.N.S.R., Pavilion and York Place Hospital, Brighton
B. Carley, Sister, T.F.N.S., 1st Eastern General Hospital, Cambridge
C. Carmichael, Staff Nurse, The Horton, County of London War. Hospital, Epsom
I. Carnaghan, Sister, Q.A.I.M.N.S.R., Kinmell Park Camp, Military Hospital, Abergele
C. L. Carnegie, Sister, T.F.N.S.
I. Carruthers, Staff Nurse, Q.A.I.M.N.S., Military Hospital, Caterham
 G. Carswell, Sister, Edinburgh War Hospital, Bangour
G. Carter, Sister, Egginton Hall Hospital, Derby, and St. Thomas Hospital, London
C. Carvel, Staff Nurse, Edinburgh War Hospital, Bangour
H. C. Chalmers, Staff Nurse, T.F.N.S., 2nd Scottish General Hospital, Craigleith, Edinburgh
G. W. Chamberlain, acting Sister, Q.A.I.M.N.S., Queen Alexandra Military Hospital, Grosvenor Road, London
K. E. J. Chapman, Sister, Q.A.I.M.N.S.R.
W. Chapman, Sister, Q.A.I.M.N.S.R., Military Hospital, Grantham
Elizabeth Charles, Staff Nurse, Norfolk War Hospital, Thorpe, Norwich
M. K. Chatterley, Assistant Matron, T.F.N.S., 1st Southern General Hospital, Edgbaston, Birmingham
S. Cherry, Sister, 1st Western General Hospital, Fazakerley, Liverpool
F. E. Child, Staff Nurse, Q.A.I.M.N.S.R.
A. Clark, Sister, Q.A.I.M.N.S.R., Barnet War Hospital
E. Clarke, Sister, Q.A.I.M.N.S.R., King George V. Hospital, Dublin
E. V. L. Clarke, Staff Nurse, Acting Sister, Q.A.I.M.N.S.
M. C. Clarke, Sister, Q.A.I.M.N.S.R., Military Hospital, Colchester
M. Clarke, Staff Nurse, Q.A.I.M.N.S.R., King George Hospital, Stamford Street, London
M. Clint, Nursing Sister, Canadian Nursing Service
L. Clough, Sister, 2nd Western General Hospital, Manchester
M. M. Cocking, Staff Nurse, Q.A.I.M.N.S.R., Military Isolation Hospital, Aldershot
A. M. Collins, Staff Nurse, Q.A.I.M.N.S.R., Military Hospital, Frensham Hill, Farnham
H. M. Connell, Acting Sister, Q.A.I.M.N.S.R.
L. M. Cook, Sister, East Suffolk and Ipswich Hospital, Ipswich
M. Cook, Staff Nurse, Huddersfield War Hospital
E. S. Cooke, Sister in charge, T.F.N.S.
S. Cooke, Staff Nurse, 2nd Western General Hospital, Manchester
M. E. Cooper, Assistant Matron, Q.A.I.M.N.S.R., Military Hospital, Colchester
H. O. Cooper, Sister, The Horton (County of London) War Hospital, Epsom
A. M. Copper, Matron, Australian Army Nursing Service
S. Corby, Staff Nurse, Q.A.I.M.N.S.R.
E. Cornwall, Matron, Australian Army Nursing Service
A. Cowie, Sister, Leith War Hospital, Leith
M. Cowie, Sister (acting Matron), T.F.N.S.
C. C. Cox, Staff Nurse, Q.A.I.M.N.S.R., Military Hospital, Fargo, Wiltshire
G. Craig, Matron, T.F.N.S., 1st Scottish General Hospital, Aberdeen
M. L. Craven, Staff Nurse, Australian Nursing Service, Lord Derby War Hospital, Warrington
E. Creech, Sister, Q.A.I.M.N.S.R., The King George Hospital, Stamford Street, London
M. H. Crooke, Assistant Matron, 1st Western General Hospital, Fazakerley, Liverpool
M. R. O'H. Cussen, Sister, Mercy Hospital, Cork
M. M. Dalrymple, Staff Nurse, Q.A.I.M.N.S.R., Military Hospital, Fargo, Wiltshire
N. Dalrymple, Sister in charge, Q.A.I.M.N.S.R.
M. Dando, Sister, 1st Western General Hospital, Fazakerley, Liverpool
K. M. Daniel, Sister, 3rd Western General Hospital, Cardiff
E. A. Davies, Sister, Gilroes Hospital, Leicester
E. S. Davies, Sister, Q.A.I.M.N.S.R.
J. Davies (now Nicholas), acting Sister, Q.A.I.M.N.S.R., Alexandra Military Hospital, Cosham
K. Davies, Staff Nurse, New Zealand Nursing Service
S. F. Davies, Staff Nurse, Acting Sister, Q.A.I.M.N.S.
I. E. Dawson, Sister, Q.A.I.M.N.S.R., Royal Victoria Hospital
Netley. R. Day, Sister, General Hospital, Birmingham
L. P. Deakin, acting Sister, Nursing Staff of Civil Hospitals
E. J. Densham, Matron, British Red Cross Society
L. Dent, Commandant, Voluntary Aid Detachment, City of London
E. I. Devenish-Meares, Sister in charge, Q.A.I.M.N.S.R.
E. Devlin, Sister, T.F.N.S., 1st Southern General Hospital, Edgbaston, Birmingham
A. Dickison, Sister, Canadian Army Nursing Service
E. Dodd, Staff Nurse, T.F.N.S.
C. C. Douet, Sister, Q.A.I.M.N.S.R., Park Hall Camp Military Hospital, Oswestry
M. Dow, Acting Matron, Q.A.I.M.N.S.R., Military Hospital, Aylesbury
E. Drysdale, Nursing Sister, Canadian Nursing Service
B. M. Duff, Sister, Q.A.I.M.N.S.R., King George V Hospital, Dublin
M. I. Duffus, Sister, Red Cross Hospital, Netley
A. Dunbabin, Sister, Nell-lane Auxiliary Military Hospital, West Didsbury, Manchester
A. Duncan, Sister in charge, Nursing Staff of Civil Hospitals
J. Duncan, Sister in charge, Nursing Staff of Civil Hospitals
J. Dunlop, Sister, T.F.N.S., 4th Scottish General Hospital, Stobhill, Glasgow
G. Dunsford, Sister, T.F.N.S., 2nd London General Hospital, St. Mark's College, Chelsea, London
E. Ealand, Staff Nurse, T.F.N.S., 1st Eastern General Hospital, Cambridge
W. E. Eardley, Staff Nurse, Acting Sister, Q.A.I.M.N.S.
B. M. W. Earle, Staff Nurse, Q.A.I.M.N.S.R.
G. I. Echlin, Sister, Australian Army Nursing Service, Roy at Victoria Hospital, Netley
J. B. Edgar, Assistant Matron, T.F.N.S., 4th Scottish General Hospital, Stobhill, Glasgow
D. Edgley, Sister, T.F.N.S., 4th Southern General Hospital, Plymouth
A. Edwards, Sister, Salford Royal Hospital, Manchester
M. G. Edwards, Sister in charge, T.F.N.S.
M. F. Eldridge, Staff Nurse, Australian Army Nursing Service
R. Elliott, Sister, Worcester General Hospital, Worcester
A. Ellis, Staff Nurse, Q.A.I.M.N.S.R., Malta
E. C. Ellis, Sister, Q.A.I.M.N.S.R.
M. P. Ellis, Nursing Sister, Canadian Nursing Service
F. Ellwood, Sister, Canadian Army Nursing Service
K. Elphick, Matron, The Lady Forester Convalescent Home, Llandudno
M. Elsdon, Sister, The Horton (County of London) War Hospital, Epsom
M. C. English, Nursing Sister, Canadian Nursing Service
L. A. Ephgrave, Staff Nurse, Q.A.I.M.N.S. Retired, Malta
J. I. Ettles, acting Matron, Q.A.I.M.N.S.R., Military Hospital, Sheerness
B. Evans, Sister, T.F.N.S., 1st Southern General Hospital, Edgbaston, Birmingham
E. G. Evans, Matron, Welsh Red Cross Hospital, Netley
J. A. Evans, Sister, Q.A.I.M.N.S., Croydon War Hospital
K. J. Fancourt, Sister, Q.A.I.M.N.S.R., Wharncliffe War Hospital, Middlewoodroad, Sheffield
A. Farren, Sister, T.F.N.S., 2nd Eastern General Hospital, Brighton
H. Ferguson, Matron, Gilford Branch Hospital, Belfast District
M. S. Finlay, House Matron, County of Middlesex War Hospital, Napsbury, St. Albans
L. M. Finlayson, Sister, T.F.N.S.
M. C. A. Fishbourne, Assistant Matron, Q.A.I.M.N.S.R., Pavilion and York Place Hospital, Brighton
M. Fitz-Henry, 1st Assistant Matron, The Horton (County of London) War Hospital, Epsom
E. G. Fleming, Sister, Australian Army Nursing Service
M. A. Fogarty, Sister, South Infirmary, Cork District
A. Foley, Sister, 3rd Western General Hospital, Cardiff
E. V. Forrest, Staff Nurse, Acting Sister, Q.A.I.M.N.S.
H. L. Fowlds, Nursing Sister, Canadian Nursing Service
S. H. Foxe, Sister, The Horton (County of London) War Hospital, Epsom
S. A. Francis, Ward Sister, Royal Infirmary, Leicester
E. C. Franklin, Sister, Q.A.I.M.N.S.R.
A. W. Fraser, Acting Matron, Q.A.I.M.N.S.R., Military Hospital, Cromarty
E. Fraser, Sister, Scottish National Red Cross Hospital, Bellahouston, Glasgow
W. Furze, Sister, University College Hospital, Gower Street, London
A. M. Gallop, Nursing Sister, Canadian Nursing Service
E. Gardner, Sister, Brook War Hospital, Woolwich
E. Gardner, Sister, T.F.N.S.
J. S. G. Gardner, Sister, Q.A.I.M.N.S.
W. M. Gedye, Staff Nurse, Acting Sister, Q.A.I.M.N.S.
C. E. J. Gerry, Sister, T.F.N.S.
M. Mel. P. Gibb, Matron, Smithson War Hospital, Greenock, Renfrewshire
P. Gibbins, Sister, Q.A.I.M.N.S.R., Military Hospital, Ripon
B. L. Gibbon, Sister, Australian Army Nursing Service, Royal Victoria Hospital, Netley
J. Gibson, Assistant Matron, Scottish National Red Cross Hospital, Bellahouston, Glasgow
F. E. Gill, Sister, T.F.N.S., 5th Southern General Hospital, Fawcett Road, Southsea
P. M. Gill, Sister, Q.A.I.M.N.S.R., The Lord Derby War Hospital, Warrington
N. C. Gillam, Matron, Q.A.I.M.N.S.R., Kinmel Park Camp Military Hospital, Abergele
J. M. R. Gilmer, Sister, New Zealand Army Nursing Service
F. M. Gittins, Sister, Q.A.I.M.N.S.R., The Lord Derby War Hospital, Warrington
A. A. Glover, acting Sister, Q.A.I.M.N.S.R., Alexandra Military Hospital, Coshani
H. M. Goldthorpe, Sister, Bethnal Green Military Hospital, Cambridge Heath
M. C. Goodhue, Secretary, County of London Branch, British Red Cross Society, and Matron i/c City of London Red Cross Hospital, Finsbury Square
L. Gordon, Sister, T.F.N.S., 1st Scottish Hospital, Aberdeen
A. Grattan, Sister, Norfolk and Norwich Hospital, Norwich
G. A. Gray, Nursing Sister, Canadian Nursing Service
N. Gray, Sister, Edinburgh War Hospital, Bangor
L. Greany, Sister, Q.A.I.M.N.S.R.
G. E. Green, Sister, Q.A.I.M.N.S.R., Queen Mary's Military Hospital, Whalley, Lancashire
J. Greig, Assistant Matron, City of London Military Hospital, Clapton
D. Groom, Staff Nurse, Q.A.I.M.N.S., Dartford War Hospital
J. E. Guffog, Staff Nurse, T.F.N.S., 2nd Western General Hospital, Manchester
M. Hadow, Sister, T.F.N.S., 3rd Southern General Hospital, Oxford
G. Haines, Nursing Sister, Q.A.M.N.S.I.
E. Hall, Staff Nurse, T.F.N.S., 5th Southern General Hospital, Fawcett Road, Southsea
J. A. Hannah, Sister, T.F.N.S., Malta
A. M. Hanock, Matron, Australian Army Nursing Service
C. E. Harley, Sister, Q.A.I.M.N.S.R., The Lord Derby War Hospital, Warrington
E. B. Harse, Sister, Fulham Military Hospital, St. Dunstan's Road, Hammersmith
A. Kidd Hart, Sister, Australian Army Nursing Service
O. M. Hart, Sister, Q.A.I.M.N.S.R., Croydon War Hospital 
W. R. Harvey, Nursing Sister, Canadian Nursing Service
 A. Hassard, Sister, Bethnal Green Military Hospital, Cambridge Heath
J. Hawson, Sister, Huddersfield War Hospital
E. H. Hay, Matron, Q.A.I.M.N.S., Central Hospital, Hampstead Military Hospital
M. E. Hay, Sister, T.F.N.S., 1st Southern General Hospital, Edgbaston, Birmingham
M. Haynes, Nurse, T.F.N.S., 2nd Eastern General Hospital, Brighton
G. E. Head, Staff Nurse, Q.A.I.M.N.S.R., Military Hospital, Bovington, Hampshire
 M. C. Headlam, Commandant Voluntary Aid Detachment Hospital, Quarry Place, Shrewsbury
F. E. Healy, Matron, Military Hospital, Surrey Home, Seaford
K. Hebdon, Asst. Matron, Northamptonshire War Hospital, Duston, Northampton
M. Hendry, Sister, T.F.N.S.
M. Herbert, Matron, Worcester General Hospital 
M. C. Herriot, Senior Asst. to Lady Superintendent of Nurses, Royal Infirmary, Edinburgh
C. Highnam, Sister, Q.A.I.M.N.S.R., Cliffe Hotel Military Hospital, Felixstowe
F. E. Hildyard, Sister, T.F.N.S., 2nd London General Hospital, St. Mark's College, Chelsea
A. B. Hill, Matron, Q.A.I.M.N.S.R., Bath War Hospital 
E. M. Hine, Staff Nurse, Q.A.I.M.N.S.R.
J. L. Hirst, Acting Sister, Q.A.I.M.N.S.R., Military Hospital, Frensham Hill, Farnham
W. I. Hoare, Sister in charge, Nursing Staff of Civil Hospitals
M. E. Hobhouse, Sister, Q.A.I.M.N.S.R., Military Hospital, Devonport
E. Hodges, acting Matron, Q.A.I.M.N.S.R., Military Hospital, Reading
E. Hodges, Staff Nurse, acting Sister, New Zealand Nursing Service
L. Holland, Nursing Sister, Canadian Nursing Service
A. Holmes, Staff Nurse, Q.A.I.M.N.S.R.
M. E. Holt, Staff Nurse, T.F.N.S., 1st Southern General Hospital, Edgbaston, Birmingham
C. Hood, Nursing Sister, Canadian Nursing Service
M. Hopton, Sister in charge, Nursing Staff of Civil Hospitals
E. Horridge, Sister, Q.A.I.M.N.S.R., Beaufort War Hospital, Fishponds, Bristol
A. Horsfall, Sister, Q.A.I.M.N.S.R., Dartford War Hospital
E. Horton, Sister, T.F.N.S., 1st Eastern General Hospital, Cambridge
L. Hotine, Assistant Matron, Norfolk War Hospital, Thorpe, Norwich
M. Houston, Sister, Q.A.I.M.N.S.R., Military Hospital, Tidworth
M. R. Houston, Sister, Q.A.I.M.N.S.R., Queen Alexandra's Imperial Military Nursing Service Hospital, 71, Vincent Square, London
A. Howard, Assistant Matron, T.F.N.S., 3rd London General Hospital, Wandsworth Common, London
L. Howarth, Sister, Northamptonshire War Hospital, Duston, Northamptonshire
M. Howe, Nursing Sister, Canadian Nursing Service
M. Huffer, Staff Nurse, Nursing Staff of Civil Hospitals
A. Hughes, Staff Nurse, T.F.N.S., 3rd Southern General Hospital, Oxford
C. E. Hughes, Commandant Voluntary Aid Detachment Hospital, Oakley Manor, Shrewsbury
M. J. Hughes, Staff Nurse, T.F.N.S.
M. Huish, Sister, Q.A.I.M.N.S.R., Beaufort War Hospital, Fishponds, Bristol
M. Humphrey-Jones, Acting Sister, Q.A.I.M.N.S.R.
E. M. Humphries, Assistant Matron, T.F.N.S., 2nd Scottish General Hospital, Craigleith, Edinburgh
F. A. Hunter, Sister, Canadian Army Nursing Service
E. Hutchings, Sister, Q.A.I.M.N.S.R., Military Hospital, Curragh Camp
S. J. Hutchinson, Matron, Coventry and Warwickshire Hospital, Coventry
Sister Superioress Imelde, Mater Infirmorum Hospital, Belfast
K. F. M. Jackson, Matron, Warneford and Leamington County Hospital, Leamington
E. W. Jeffries, Sister, Australian Army Nursing Service
M. Jennings, Sister, T.F.N.S.
E. M. St. John, Sister, Q.A.I.M.N.S.R., Royal Victoria Hospital, Netley
A. Johnson, Staff Nurse, T.F.N.S., 3rd London General Hospital Wandsworth Common, London
C. V. S. Johnson, Sister, Q.A.I.M.N.S.
A. E. Johnston, Sister, Canadian Red Cross, Malta
M. C. Johnston, Sister, Q.A.I.M.N.S., Military Hospital, Frensham Hill, Farnham
Marion Johnston, Acting Sister, Q.A.I.M.N.S.R.
N. Johnston, Staff Nurse, T.F.N.S., Merryflatts War Hospital, Govan, Glasgow
C. Johnstone, Matron, Woodside Central Hospital, Glasgow
J. Johnstone, Nursing Sister, Canadian Nursing Sendee
E. Jones, Matron, Infirmary Staff, St. Luke's War Hospital, Halifax
F. A. Jones, Staff Nurse, 1st Western General Hospital, Fazakerley, Liverpool
N. Jones, Sister, T.F.N.S., 2nd Southern General Hospital, Maudlin Street, Bristol
J. Jordan, Matron, Mercer's Hospital, Dublin
M. Kell, acting Matron, Q.A.I.M.N.S.R., Military Hospital, Reading
A. Kelly, Lady Superintendent, Jervis Street Hospital, Dublin
A. M. Kelson, Sister, T.F.N.S.
A. A. Kemp, Staff Nurse, Australian Nursing Service, Lord Derby War Hospital, Warrington
H. M. Kendall, Sister, T.F.N.S., 5th Northern General Hospital, Leicester
J. V. M. Kennedy, Sister, Australian Array Nursing Service
K. Kennedy, Sister, Royal City of Dublin Hospital
C. M. Keys, Sister, Australian Army Nursing Service
E. Killingbeck, acting Sister, Nursing Staff of Civil Hospitals
R. G. Kind, Matron, Australian Army Nursing Service
M. B. Kinloch, Matron, Leith War Hospital 
J. C. Kirkpatrick, Sister-in-Charge, T.F.N.S., York Hill War Hospital, Glasgow
M. H. Klamborowski, Sister, Q.A.I.M.N.S.R.
G. Knight, Matron, General Hospital, Nottingham
L. Lane, Assistant Matron, Q.A.I.M.N.S.R., 2nd Birmingham War Hospital, Northfield, Birmingham
C. Laurenson, Sister, Welsh Met. War Hospital, Whitchurch, Cardiff
A. C. Lawson, Matron, Firvale Union, Sheffield
N. Leake, Staff Nurse, Australian Army Nursing Service
E. Leech, Sister, Q.A.I.M.N.S.R., Military Hospital, Pembroke Dock
G. Lewis, Staff Nurse, T.F.N.S., 5th Northern General Hospital, Leicester
B. O. Lidstone, Staff Nurse, Q.A.I.M.N.S.R.
G. Litton, Sister, T.F.N.S., 5th Southern General Hospital, Pawcett Road, Southsea
E. M. Logie, acting Sister, Q.A.I.M.N.S.R., Connaught Hospital, Aldershot
E. M. Lovell, Staff Nurse, Q.A.I.M.N.S.R., Connaught Hospital, Aldershot
M. M. Low, Matron, Springburn Woodside Central Hospital, Glasgow
J. B. Lyle, Staff Nurse, T.F.N.S.
M. Lytle, Sister, Meath Hospital, Dublin
M. Macaffee, Nursing Sister, Canadian Nursing Service
C. MacCallum, Matron, Dykebar War Hospital, Paisley
J. M. Macdonald, Sister, Canadian Army Nursing Service
J. Macdonald, Sister, T.F.N.S., Merryflatts War Hospital, Govan, Glasgow
C. D. Macfie, Staff Nurse, T.F.N.S., 4th Scottish, General Hospital, Stobhill, Glasgow
D. J. MacGregor, Staff Nurse, Q.A.I.M.N.S., county of Middlesex War Hospital, Napsbury, St. Albans
C. I. Mackenzie, Staff Nurse, Bradford War Hospital
H. A. MacLaughlin, Nursing Sister, Canadian Nursing Service
C. Macleod, Sister, Acting Matron, Q.A.I.M.N.S.R.
J. MacMaster, Matron, North Staffordshire Infirmary, Stoke-on-Trent
C. L. MacNaughton, Sister, Q.A.I.M.N.S.R., Military Hospital, Victoria Barracks, Belfast
M. Macrae, Matron, H.I.H. The Grand Duchess George of Russia's Hospital, Harrow
A. Maddox, Sister, T.F.N.S., 5th Southern General Hospital, Fawcett Road, Southsea
E. M. Malin, Sister, Q.A.I.M.N.S.R., Military Hospital, York, retired
D. G. Mallet, acting Sister, Q.A.I.M.N.S., Military Hospital, Reading
M. Manfield, Sister, T.F.N.S., 2nd Eastern General Hospital, Brighton
F. E. Mansfield, acting Matron, Q.A.I.M.N.S., Military Hospital, Canterbury
E. P. Mapstone, Sister, Q.A.I.M.N.S.R., Military Hospital, Sutton Veny
A. Markwick, Sister in charge, Q.A.I.M.N.S.R., Military Hospital, Purfleet
M. E. Marsh, Sister, T.F.N.S., 3rd Southern General Hospital, Oxford
M. R. Marsh, Nursing Sister, Canadian Nursing Service
C. H. Marshall, Sister, Australian Army Nursing Service
E. F. Mason, Staff Nurse, Q.A.I.M.N.S.R.
G. H. Mavety, Nursing Sister, Canadian Nursing Service
M. Maxwell, Sister, British Red Cross Society
M. Mayne, Sister, Great Eastern Hotel Military Hospital Harwich
G. C. Maywood, Assistant Matron, British Red Cross Hospital, Netley
M. A. McCabe, Staff Nurse, Q.A.I.M.N.S., Military Hospital, Lichfield
F. McClelland, Staff Nurse, Acting Sister, Q.A.I.M.N.S.
N. C. McCurdy, Nursing Sister, Canadian Nursing Service
M. McIlwrath, Staff Nurse, Q.A.I.M.N.S.R.
E. McMunn, Sister, Richmond Hospital, Dublin
M. I. McNaughton, acting Sister, Q.A.I.M.N.S., Queen Alexandra's Military Hospital, Grosvenor Road
H. McNulty, Sister, Q.A.I.M.N.S.R.
M. M. McNulty, Sister, Australian Army Nursing Service
G. B. McPherson, Nursing Sister, Canadian Nursing Service
M. A. Meeke, Sister in charge, Q.A.I.M.N.S.R.
M. Merriless, Sister, Q.A.I.M.N.S.R., Royal Victoria Hospital, Netley
G. Miller, Sister, Q.A.I.M.N.S.R., Malta
R. Miller, acting Sister, Nursing Staff of Civil Hospitals
V. Mills, Matron Australian Army Nursing Service
M. Mitchell, Sister, Q.A.I.M.N.S.R., Military Hospital, Pembroke Dock
A. S. Moir, Sister, Dundee War Hospital, Mains Loan, Dundee
E. Monteith, Staff Nurse, T.F.N.S., 5th Southern General Hospital, Fawcett Road, Southsea
C. A. Morris, Sister, Q.A.I.M.N.S.R., Prees Heath Camp Military Hospital, Whitchurch
M. E. Morris, Sister, Manchester Royal Infirmary
J. E. S. Morrison, Sister, Q.A.I.M.N.S.R., Prees Heath Military Camp Hospital, Whitchurch
M. Morrison, Q.A.I.M.N.S.R., acting Sister, Cambridge Hospital, Aldershot
M. Motherwell, Nursing Sister, Canadian Nursing Service
E. Mucklow, Staff Nurse, T.F.N.S., Malta
C. Muirhead, Sister, T.F.N.S., 1st Scottish General Hospital, Aberdeen
J. Murphy, Sister of Charity, North Infirmary, Cork
E. Nicholson, Staff Nurse, T.F.N.S., 1st Northern General Hospital, Newcastle upon Tyne
E. Nixon, Matron, New Zealand Army Nursing Service
A. E. Noble, Sister, Q.A.I.M.N.S.R., Military Hospital, Dover
M. Nunn, Staff Nurse, Q.A.I.M.N.S.R., Military Hospital, Sutton Veny
A. O.'Neill, Staff Nurse, Q.A.I.M.N.S.R., Queen Mary's Military Hospital, Whalley, Lancashire
K. O'Connell, Sister, Brook War Hospital, Woolwich
A. O'Neill, Sister, Australian Army Nursing Service
K. A. O'Reilly, Sister, Q.A.I.M.N.S.R., Military Hospital, Tidworth
M. A. Oakley, Staff Nurse, T.F.N.S., Malta
A. M. Pagan, acting Matron, Q.A.I.M.N.S., The Castle Military Hospital, Edinburgh
I. R. Page, Sister, Southwark Military Hospital, East Dulwich Grove, London
H. L. A. Parkinson, Assistant Matron, Q.A.I.M.N.S.R., retired, Military Hospital, Devonport
L. M. Parr, Staff Nurse, Q.A.I.M.N.S.R., Fort Pitt Military Hospital, Chatham
A. H. Paton, Q.A.I.M.N.S.R., Queen Mary's Hospital, Whalley, Lancashire
E. Pearson, Staff Nurse, Isl Western General Hospital, Fazakerley, Liverpool
F. Pearson, Sister, Q.A.I.M.N.S.R., Military Hospital, Bagthorpe
M. Pedler, acting Matron, Q.A.I.M.N.S., Military Hospital, Magdalen Camp, Winchester
E. Pemberton, Sister, 2nd Western General Hospital, Manchester
M. C. Pemberton, Sister, Q.A.I.M.N.S.R., Royal Herbert Hospital, Woolwich
E. F. Pense, Nursing Sister, Canadian Nursing Service
N. Peplow, Sister, T.F.N.S., 4th London General Hospital, King's College, Denmark Hill
A. H. Peppier, Assistant Matron, T.F.N.S., 2nd London General Hospital, St. Mark's College, Chelsea, London
M. K. Perry, acting Sister, Q.A.I.M.N.S.R., Military Hospital, Reading
E. Peters, Staff Nurse, T.F.N.S., 1st London General Hospital, St. Gabriel's College, Camberwell, London
E. H. Phillips, Matron, Gizeh Hospital, Cairo
C. Pierce, Sister, Q.A.I.M.N.S.R., Beaufort War Hospital, Fishponds, Bristol
D. Pierse, Staff Nurse, Q.A.I.M.N.S.R., Royal Victoria. Hospital, Netley
K. Platt, Matron, New End Section, Hampstead Military Hospital, London
A. L. Plimsaul, Staff Nurse, Acting Sister, Q.A.I.M.N.S.
M. G. Poole, Sister, T.F.N.S., 5th Northern General Hospital, Leicester
I. J. Pooley, Matron, Q.A.I.M.N.S., Retired, Berrington War Hospital
C. Porter, Sister, Leeds General Infirmary
R. E. Potter, Sister, Chester Royal Infirmary
K. A. Prendergast, Sister in charge, Q.A.I.M.N.S.R.
J. Prentice, Sister, T.F.N.S.
E. L. Preston, Sister, 1st London General Hospital, St. Gabriel's College, Camberwell, London
I. Proskaner, Sister, Q.A.I.M.N.S.R., Chiseldon Military Hospital, Chiseldon Camp, Wiltshire
L. Rea, Sister, T.F.N.S., 1st Northern General Hospital, Armstrong College, Newcastle upon Tyne
S. M. Rea, Staff Nurse, Q.A.I.M.N.S.R., Malta
K. Read, Sister in charge, Q.A.I.M.N.S.R.
A. Reay, Matron, Darlington Union Infirmary
B. J. D. Reid, Sister in charge, Q.A.I.M.N.S.R.
M. Reid, Staff Nurse, Q.A.I.M.N.S.R.
V. Reindorp, Sister, University College Hospital, Gower Street, London
L. Remnant, acting Sister, Nursing Staff of Civil Hospitals
C. B. Robb, Sister in charge, Nursing Staff of Civil Hospitals
A. E. Roberts, Staff Nurse, T.F.N.S.
C. Roberts, Sister, Q.A.I.M.N.S.R., Nottingham War Hospital
E. Robertson, Sister, T.F.N.S., Malta
J. Robertson, Nursing Sister, Canadian Nursing Service
A. Robinson, Sister, T.F.N.S., 3rd Northern General Hospital, Collegiate Hall, Sheffield
J. S. Rodger, Acting Sister, Q.A.I.M.N.S.R.
E. Roethenbaugh, Sister, T.F.N.S.
F. M. Rollinson, Sister, General Hospital, Croydon
D. L. Rollo, Acting Sister, Q.A.I.M.N.S.R.
M. Rose, Nursing Sister, Canadian Nursing Service
O. Rose, Sister, T.F.N.S., 3rd Northern General Hospital, Collegiate Hall, Sheffield
E. M. Ross, Sister and Deputy Matron, Welsh Red Cross Hospital, Netley
E. D. Rush, Staff Nurse, Australian Army Nursing Service
G. Rushforth, Staff Nurse, T.F.N.S., 1st Southern General Hospital, Edgbaston, Birmingham
M. Russell, Matron, Australian Army Nursing Service
B. Ryan, Staff Nurse, Q.A.I.M.N.S.R., Military Hospital, Reading
C. Sandbach, Staff Nurse, Acting Sister, Q.A.I.M.N.S.
Lady Sargant, Nurse, St. Anselm's Voluntary Aid Detachment Hospital, Walmer
D. J. Saunder, Sister, Q.A.I.M.N.S., Mont Dore Military Hospital, Bournemouth
A. M. Saunders, Nursing Sister, 3rd London General Hospital, Wandsworth Common
E. O. Schofield, Sister in charge, Nursing Staff of Civil Hospitals
A. Scott-Pullar, Staff Nurse, T.F.N.S.
M. Scott-Watt, Staff Nurse, T.F.N.S.
M. T. Sellar, Staff Nurse, Q.A.I.M.N.S.R.
C. E. Shackell, Matron, Australian Army Nursing Service
E. E. Simpson, Sister, 2nd Western General Hospital, Manchester
E. R. Sloan, Sister in charge, T.F.N.S.
A. P. Smartt, Sister in charge, Nursing Staff of Civil Hospitals
A. E. Smith, Sister, Q.A.I.M.N.S.R., Military Hospital, Bagthorpe
A. S. Smith, Sister, Q.A.I.M.N.S.R., The Lord Derby War Hospital, Warrington
C. Smith, Staff Nurse, Q.A.I.M.N.S.R., Cambridge Hospital, Aldershot
E. M. Smith, Matron, Nell Lane Military Hospital, West Didsbury, Manchester
I. B. Smith, Nursing Sister, Canadian Nursing Service
K. M. Smith, Assistant Matron, T.F.N.S., 2nd Southern General Hospital, Maudlin Street, Bristol
M. B. Smith, Staff Nurse, Q.A.I.M.N.S., County of Middlesex War Hospital, Napsbury, St. Albans
M. Smith, acting Sister, Q.A.I.M.N.S.R., Military Hospital, Eastbourne
P. E. Smith, Assistant Matron, T.F.N.S., 2nd Northern General Hospital, Leeds
R. A. Smith, Sister, Bradford War Hospital
M. Somers, Sister, Dr. Steeven's Hospital, Dublin
E. A. Sordy, Matron, Queen Mary's Hospital for the East End, Stratford, London
F. H. Speedy, Sister, New Zealand Nursing Service
V. Spencer-Jones, 1st Asst. Matron, Nelllane Auxiliary Military Hospital, West Didsbury, Manchester
B. Spoor, Sister, T.F.N.S., 1st Northern General Hospital, Armstrong College, Newcastle upon Tyne
E. Staveley, Sister, Stepping Hill Hospital, Stockport
R. J. G. Steel, Matron, T.F.N.S., Cambuslang War Hospital, Glasgow
E. Steggall, Sister, 3rd Western General Hospital, Cardiff
A. B. Stevens, Staff Nurse, American Nursing Service
G. L. Stevens, acting Sister, Q.A.I.M.N.S., Military Hospital, Colchester
M. H. Stevens, acting Sister, Q.A.I.M.N.S.R., Cambridge Hospital, Aldershot.
J. C. Stewart, Sister, T.F.N.S., 4th London General Hospital, King's College, Denmark Hill
K. S. Stewart, Matron, County Hospital, York
U. M. Stidston, Sister, Q.A.I.M.N.S.R., King George Hospital, Stamford Street, London
E. Stone, Staff Nurse, T.F.N.S., 2nd Southern General Hospital, Maudlin Street, Bristol
G. Stones, Sister, T.F.N.S., Malta
I. D. Strathy, Nursing Sister, Canadian Nursing Service
M. B. Street, Acting Sister, Q.A.I.M.N.S.R.
E. M. Strikland, Matron, Australian Army Nursing Service
E. Sutton, Matron, St. Vincent's Hospital, Dublin
J. Taggart, Sister in charge, Nursing Staff of Civil Hospitals
F. M. Tailer, Sister, T.F.N.S.
M. C. Tawnay, Staff Nurse, Acting Sister, Q.A.I.M.N.S.
A. Taylor, Sister, Adelaide Hospital, Dublin
L. Taylor, Sister, Welsh Hospital, Whitchurch, Cardiff
R. M. M. Taylor, Sister, Q.A.I.M.N.S.R., Military Hospital, Sutton Veny
A. C. W. Teevan, Staff Nurse, Acting Sister, Q.A.I.M.N.S.
G. Thacker, Staff Nurse, T.F.N.S., 4th Northern General Hospital, Lincoln
M. Thomas, Royal Infirmary, Liverpool
M. Thornton, Matron, Sir Patrick Dunne's Hospital, Dublin
N. H. Thorpe, acting Matron, Brook War Hospital, Woolwich
W. E. Tice, Sister in charge, Nursing Staff of Civil Hospitals
M. E. Tilney, Nursing Sister, South African Military Nursing Service, South Africa Hospital, Richmond Park
M. M. Timpson, Sister in charge, Nursing Staff of Civil Hospitals
B. S. Tinkler, Sister, T.F.N.S.
A. Tonneau, (Sister Superior, Euphemie), Kemptown French Convalescent Hospital, Brighton
J. Townsend, Sister, T.F.N.S., 5th Southern General Hospital, Fawcett Road, Southsea
K. D. Underwood, Matron, Q.A.I.M.N.S.R., Beaufort War Hospital, Fishponds, Bristol
M. Veenan, Matron, Australian Army Nursing Service
K. M. Vine, acting Sister, Q.A.I.M.N.S.R., Cambridge Hospital, Aldershot
E. Wakeling, Matron, The Glen Voluntary Aid Detachment Hospital, Southend-on-Sea
M. Walker, Sister, T.F.N.S., 4th London General Hospital, King's College, Denmark Hill, London
M. Wallace, Sister, T.F.N.S., 2nd Scottish General Hospital, Craigleith, Edinburgh
O. Walters, Sister, Territorial Force Nursing Service, 4th Northern General Hospital, Lincoln
E. L. Ward, Sister, Q.A.I.M.N.S.R., Aldershot Isolation Hospital
H. Ward, Assistant Matron, Territorial Force Nursing Service, 4th Northern General Hospital, Lincoln
G. M. Watkins, Staff Nurse, Acting Sister, Q.A.I.M.N.S.
E. M. Watmore, Sister, T.F.N.S.
M. Watson, Staff Nurse, Q.A.I.M.N.S.R., King George Hospital, Stamford Street, London
E. J. Watt, acting Sister, Nursing Staff of Civil Hospitals
E. Webster, Staff Nurse, Q.A.I.M.N.S.R., Queen Mary's Military Hospital, Whalley, Lancashire
L. E. Were, Assistant Matron, Q.A.I.M.N.S.R. (Royal Sussex County Hospital, Brighton), County of Middlesex Hospital, Napsbury, St. Albans
M. A. West, Sister, Nursing Service Reserve, Northumberland War Hospital, Gosforth, Newcastle upon Tyne
M. West, Assistant Matron, Australian Army Nursing Service Reserve, Malta
A. E. Wharton, Sister, Q.A.I.M.N.S.R., Alexandra Military Hospital, Cosham
H. M. Wharton, Nurse, Territorial Force Nursing Service, 2nd Northern General Hospital, Leeds
K. V. White, acting Sister, Nursing Staff of Civil Hospitals
I. M. Whyte, Staff Nurse, Acting Sister, Q.A.I.M.N.S.
M. H. Wilkie, Sister, New Zealand Army Nursing Service
E. Wilkinson, Sister, Territorial Force Nursing Service, 1st Scottish General Hospital, Aberdeen
L. Willans, Civil Nurse, Infectious Hospital, Walkergate
M. Willes, Staff Nurse, Acting Sister, Q.A.I.M.N.S.
A. E. Williams, Sister, Lewisham Military Hospital, London
B. M. Williams, Sister, Australian Army Nursing Service
F. E. Williams, Staff Nurse, Australian Army Nursing Service
M. S. Williams, Sister, Q.A.I.M.N.S.
G. E. P. Williamson, Sister, Q.A.I.M.N.S.R., Croydon War Hospital, Surrey
F. Wilson, Matron, New Zealand Army Nursing Service
H. Wilson, Sister, The Horton County of London War Hospital, Epsom, Surrey
M. Wilson, Acting Sister, Q.A.I.M.N.S.R.
V. M. Wilson, Sister, Territorial Force Nursing Service, 5th London General Hospital, St. Thomas Hospital, Lambeth, London
M. E. Wingate, Sister, Q.A.I.M.N.S.R., Fort Pitt Military Hospital, Chatham
A. G. Wishart, Staff Nurse, Territorial Force Nursing Service, 1st Scottish General Hospital, Aberdeen
A. H. Withers, Matron, Q.A.I.M.N.S.R., Guildford War Hospital, Warren Road
M. Wolsey, acting Sister, Nursing Staff of Civil Hospitals
E. M. Wood, Sister, The Horton (County of London) War Hospital, Epsom, Surrey
M. D. Woodhouse, Sister, Q.A.I.M.N.S.
T. M. Woodward, Sister, Q.A.I.M.N.S.R., Queen Mary's Military Hospital, Whalley, Lancashire
M. E. Wragge, Sister, Q.A.I.M.N.S.R.
M. J. Wray, Staff Nurse, Q.A.I.M.N.S.R., Queen Mary's Military Hospital, Whalley, Lancashire
A. McD. Wright, acting Sister, Nursing Staff of Civil Hospitals
M. I. Wright, Sister, Q.A.I.M.N.S.R., Queen Alexandra's Military Hospital, Grosvenor Road, London
M. Wright, Sister, Alder Hey Auxiliary Hospital, Knottyash, Liverpool
F. H. Wylie, Nursing Sister, Canadian Nursing Service
E. A. R. Yockney, Staff Nurse, Q.A.I.M.N.S., Malta

Distinguished Service Order (DSO)

Captain Spencer Acklom, Highland Light Infantry, attached Northumberland Fusiliers
Captain Francis George Ager, Army Service Corps
Major Charles Marshall Ainslie, Army Service Corps
Major William Dallas Alexander, Royal Artillery
Major John Grahame Buchanan Allardyce, Royal Field Artillery
Captain Cecil Allen, Royal Field Artillery
Major Harold Allen, Royal Artillery
Temp Major George Coventry Alletson, Remount Service
Major Edward Saunders Allsup, Royal Artillery
Major Edward Philip Anderson, Royal Engineers
Major William Bower Anley, Royal Garrison Artillery
Captain William Henry Annesley, late Royal West Kent Regiment
Major Henry Archer, Royal Artillery
Captain Robert George Archibald, MB, Royal Army Medical Corps, employed Egyptian Army
Captain Frank Rhodes Armitage, MB, Royal Army Medical Corps
Major and Brevet Lieutenant-Colonel George Ayscough Armytage, King's Royal Rifle Corps
Temp Major John Effingham Arnold, Army Service Corps
Major Ralph Arnott, Royal Artillery
Major Lionel Francis Arthur, Indian Army
Lieutenant-Colonel Marcus Hill Babington, Royal Army Medical Corps
Major George Badham-Thornhill, Royal Artillery
Major Philip Robert Bald, Royal Engineers
Major Harry Miller Ballingall, Royal Artillery
Lieutenant Edgar James Bannatyne, Hussars and Royal Flying Corps
Captain and Brevet Major Michael George Henry Barker, Lincolnshire Regiment
Captain Leslie John Barley, Scottish Rifles
Major Miles Barne, Suffolk Yeomanry
Major and Brevet Lieutenant-Colonel William Henry Bartholomew, Royal Artillery
Major William Hugh Barton, Army Service Corps
Major John Holgate Bateson, Royal Artillery
Captain John Beardmore Batten, Manchester Regiment
Captain Victor Cecil Bawden, London Regiment
Major Atwell Charles Baylay, Royal Engineers
Major Edward Archibald Theodore Bayly, Royal Welsh Fusiliers, attached Egyptian Army
Captain Winfred Kelsey Beaman, Royal Army Medical Corps
Captain Frederick Arnot Beam,  MB, Royal Army Medical Corps
Major Cecil Morgan Ley Becher, Royal Irish Rifles
Major John Harold Whitworth Becke, Nottinghamshire & Derbyshire Regiment, and Royal Flying Corps
Temp Major Gawain Murdoch Bell, Hampshire Regiment
Lieutenant-Colonel Richard Carmichael Bell, Indian Army
Major William Cory Howard Bell, Royal Artillery
Major William Bennett, MB, Royal Army Medical Corps
Major Robert Benson, Royal Artillery
Lieutenant-Colonel William Arthur Benson, Royal Army Medical Corps
Captain and Brevet Major Denis John Charles Kirwan Bernard, Rifle Brigade
Captain Valentine Oakley Beuttler, Army Service Corps
Captain Reginald Ernest Bickerton, MB, Royal Army Medical Corps
Major Maurice McClean Bidder, Royal Engineers
Major and Brevet Lieutenant-Colonel Harry Biddulph, Royal Engineers
Captain Clarence August Bird, Royal Engineers
Major Elliot Beverly Bird, Royal Army Medical Corps
Captain Claud Hamilton Griffith Black, Lancers
Major Robert Barclay Black, MB, Royal Army Medical Corps
Temp Lieutenant-Colonel Stewart Ward William Blacker, Royal Irish Fusiliers
Lieutenant-Colonel Robert James Blackham, Royal Army Medical Corps
Major John Eaton Blackwall, Nottinghamshire & Derbyshire Regiment
Captain John Blakiston-Houston, Hussars
Lieutenant-Colonel Ernest William Bliss, Royal Army Medical Corps
Major Conrad Edward Grant Blunt, Reserve of Officers
Temp Major Thomas Henry Boardman, Royal Irish Fusiliers
Major Sydney Alexander Boddam-Whetham, Royal Artillery
Lieutenant-Colonel Henry Hendley Bond, Royal Field Artillery
Major Charles Bonham-Carter, Royal West Kent Regiment
Major Aubrey Holmes Bolton, Gloucestershire Regiment
Captain Francis Osborne Bowen, Royal Irish Regiment
Major Claude Edward Syndercombe Bower, Royal Artillery
Quartermaster and Honorary Major William Bowes, Lancashire Fusiliers
Major Charles Edward Boyce, Royal Artillery
Lieutenant-Colonel Harry Augustus Boyce, Royal Field Artillery
Captain Ernest Charles Patrick Boyle, Honourable Artillery Company
Major Edward Austen Bradford, King's Royal Rifle Corps
Major Frederick Ewart Bradshaw, Rifle Brigade
Major Robert Napier Bray, West Riding Regiment
Captain William Basil Charles-Bridge, Argyll & Sutherland Highlanders
Captain Eustace Carlile Brierley
Temp Major Arthur Henry Daniel Britton, Army Service Corps
Lieutenant-Colonel Henry Jenkins Brock, Royal Field Artillery
Major Alan Francis Brooke, Royal Field Artillery
Lieutenant-Colonel Edward William Saurin Brooke, Royal Artillery
Captain Geoffrey Francis Heremon Brooke, Lancers
Major Frederick Brousson, Royal Artillery
Major Charles Turner Brown, Royal Engineers
Honorary Major and Temp. Honorary Lieutenant-Colonel Oscar Brown, Army Ordnance Depot
Major Andrew Duncan Montague Browne, Royal Lancaster Regiment
Captain George Buckston-Browne, Royal Field Artillery
Major John Gilbert Browne, Hussars
Major William Theodore Redmond Browne, Army Service Corps
Captain and Brevet Major Guy James Brownlow, Rifle Brigade
Major Kenneth Hope Bruce, Gordon Highlanders
Major Robert Bruce, Gordon Highlanders
Major John Handfield Brunskill, MB, Royal Army Medical Corps
Major Alan Bryant, Gloucestershire Regiment
Major Ronald Anderson Bryden, Royal Army Medical Corps
Major William Napier Budgen, Royal Artillery
Major John Dashwood Buller, Army Service Corps
Major Richard Archibald Bulloch, Royal Highlanders
Major Arthur Burdett Burdett, York & Lancaster Regiment, and Royal Flying Corps
Captain Frederick Reginald Burnside, Hussars
Major Colin Burton, Army Service Corps
Temp Major Herbert Fulford Bush, Army Service Corps
Major James Alexander Butchart, Royal Artillery
Captain Patrick Richard Butler, Royal Irish Regiment
Lieutenant-Colonel Frank Anstie Buzzard, Royal Field Artillery
Major John Dillon Byrne, Royal Artillery
Captain Thomas Algar Elliott Cairnes, Dragoon Guards, and Royal Flying Corps
Captain Hector Mackay Calder, MB, Royal Army Medical Corps
Temp Major Cecil Aylmer Cameron, Intelligence Corps
Captain James Alexander Campbell, Suffolk Regiment
Major Robert Campbell, Cameron Highlanders
Major Ronald Bruce Campbell, Gordon Highlanders
Lieutenant-Colonel George Ambrose Cardew, Royal Artillery
Lieutenant-Colonel Harold Eustace Carey, Royal Field Artillery
Captain Wilfrid Leathes de Mussenden Carey, Royal Engineers
Major Charles Cattley Carr, Reserve of Officers
Major George Arthur Buxton Carr, London Regiment
Major Harrie Gardiner Carr, Royal Artillery
Captain and Brevet Major Lawrence Carr, Gordon Highlanders
Lieutenant-Colonel Frederick Fitzgerald Carroll, MB, Royal Army Medical Corps
Captain Louis Alfred Latimer Carter, Army Service Corps
Major Reginald Wingfield Castle, Royal Garrison Artillery
Captain John Adrian Chamier, Indian Army and Royal Flying Corps
Major George Arthur Emerson Chapman, East Kent Regiment
Major Eric Montagu Seton Charles, Royal Engineers
Lieutenant-Colonel Claud Edward Charles Graham Charlton, Royal Artillery
Captain Sydney Herbert Charrington, Hussars
Major Nigel Keppel Charteris, Royal Scots
Lieutenant-Colonel William Frederick Cheesewright, Royal Engineers
Captain William Arthur Vere Churton, Cheshire Regiment
Major Craufurd Alexander Gordon Clark, London Regiment
Lieutenant-Colonel Sir Edward Henry St. Lawrence Clarke, West Yorkshire Regiment
Captain Edwin Percy Clarke, Suffolk Regiment
Major Marshal Falconer Clarke, Cheshire Regiment
Major Mervyn Officer Clarke, Royal Fusiliers
Temp Major Frederick Holden Cleaver, Special List and Royal Flying Corps
Lieutenant-Colonel Robert William Clements, MB, Royal Army Medical Corps
Captain Percy James Clifton, Royal Field Artillery
Captain George Charles Knights Clowes, London Regiment
Major Percy Lionel Coates, Gloucestershire Regiment
Captain Ralph Patteson Cobbold, North Lancashire Regiment
Major Horace Walter Cobham, Liverpool Regiment
Temp Captain Frederick Sydney Cockram, Middlesex Regiment
Lieutenant-Colonel Clifford Coffin, Royal Engineers
Major George Burdett Coleman, Army Service Corps
Honorary Major John Richard Collacott, Army Ordnance Depot
Lieutenant-Colonel Harold Collinson, MB , Royal Army Medical Corps
Major Herbert William Allan Collum, Army Service Corps
Captain Julian Campbell Colquhoun, Leinster Regiment
Captain George Lethbridge Colvin, General List
Major John Marcus Hobson Conway, Royal Army Medical Corps
Major George Stanley Curtis Cooke, Royal Engineers
Brevet Lieutenant-Colonel Herbert Fothergill Cooke, Indian Army
Captain Myer Coplans, MD, Royal Army Medical Corps
Captain Frederick Alleyne Corfield, Army Service Corps
Temp Major Arthur Egerton Cotton, Rifle Brigade
Major Frederick Harold Courtney, Royal Garrison Artillery
Captain Malcolm Gordon Cowper, East Yorkshire Regiment
Major Charles Henry Fortnom Cox, Royal Field Artillery 
Brevet Major Patrick Godfrey Ashley Cox, Rifle Brigade
Major Waldemar Sigismund Dacre Craven, Royal Field Artillery
Major Richard Parry Crawley, Army Service Corps
Major Codrington Howard Rees Crawshay, Royal Welsh Fusiliers
Temp Lieutenant-Colonel Basil Edwin Crockett, Hampshire Regiment
Major William Denman Croft, Scottish Rifles
Major Leonard Markham Crofts, Royal West Surrey Regiment
Temp Lieutenant-Colonel James Dayrolles Crosbie, Lancashire Fusiliers
Rev. Ernest Courtenay Crosse, Royal Army Chaplains' Department
Temp Lieutenant-Colonel Frank Percy Crozier, Royal Irish Rifles
Temp Major Charles Edward Cummins, Durham Light Infantry
Major Thomas Cunningham-Cunningham, Royal Artillery
Major Reginald Heaton Locke Cutbill, Army Service Corps
Captain Henry Wolryohe Dakeyne, Royal Warwickshire Regiment
Major Thomas Gerald Dalby, King's Royal Rifle Corps
Major Frank William Daniell, Northumberland Fusiliers
Major Frederic Gustavus Danielsen, Royal Warwickshire Regiment
Major Robert Henry Darwall, Royal Marines, attd. Egyptian Army
Major Hugh Allan Davidson, MB, Royal Army Medical Corps
Lieutenant-Colonel Percy Matcham Davies, Army Service Corps
Major George William Patrick Dawes, Royal Berkshire Regiment and Royal Flying Corps
Captain Alan Geoffrey Charles Dawnay, Coldstream Guards
Major John Day, Royal Engineers
Captain Frederick Farrer Deakin, Yorkshire Hussars
Major Arthur Cecil Hamilton Dean, Royal Garrison Artillery
Major Henry Victor Mottet de la Fontaine, East Surrey Regiment
Lieutenant-Colonel James George Dennistoun, Royal Field Artillery
Major Philip Oliver Ellard d'Esterre, East Lancashire Regiment
Rev. F. Devas, Royal Army Chaplains' Department
Lieutenant-Colonel Richard Stretton de Winton, Royal Garrison Artillery
Captain David Dickie, Royal Army Medical Corps
Captain Gilbert Henry Dive, Royal Army Medical Corps
Temp Lieutenant-Colonel Frederick Alfred Dixon, Royal Field Artillery
Major Arthur Curtis Dobson, Royal Engineers
Major John Archibald Don, Royal Artillery
Captain Ralph Charles Donaldson-Hudson, Reserve and Royal Flying Corps
Major Frederic George William Draffen, Scottish Rifles
Lieutenant-Colonel Gilbert Drage, Herefordshire Regiment
Captain Godfrey Drage, Royal Munster Fusiliers
Temp Captain John Steuart Duckett, Lancers
Major Basil Lawrence Duke, Royal Artillery
Major Charles Harold Dumbbell, Nottinghamshire & Derbyshire Regiment
Major and Brevet Lieutenant-Colonel Frederick Charles Dundas, Argyll & Sutherland Highlanders
Major Frank Passy Dunlop, Worcestershire Regiment
Major Alexander Edward, Earl of Dunmore, Lancers
Lieutenant-Colonel Henry Mason Dunn, MB, Royal Army Medical Corps
Captain Francis James Du Pré, Hussars
Major and Brevet Lieutenant-Colonel Bertie Cunynghame Dwyer, Leicestershire Regiment
Captain Charles Edward Campbell Eagles, Royal Marine Light Infantry, Royal Marines
Major Theodore Eardley-Wilmot, York & Lancaster Regiment
Major Schomberg Henley Eden, Royal Highlanders
Temp Major Francis Joseph Frederick Edlmann, Northumberland Fusiliers
Captain Georgia Bennick Edwards, Royal Army Medical Corps
Temp Major George Richard Owen Edwards, Royal Field Artillery
Major Charles Allen Elliott, Royal Engineers
Lieutenant-Colonel Otto William Alexander Eisner, Royal Army Medical Corps
Major Henry Horace Andrews Emerson, MB, Royal Army Medical Corps
Captain Cecil Loraine Estridge, West Yorkshire Regiment
Captain Arthur Percivale Evans, King's Royal Rifle Corps
Major George Farrington Evans, Royal Engineers
Major Llewelyn Evans, Royal Engineers
Major Edward Arthur Fagan, Indian Army
El Bimbashi (Majajor) Ahmed Fahmi (Effendi), Egyptian Army
Lieutenant Charles Herbert Fair, London Regiment
Temp Lieutenant-Colonel Herbert Francis Fenn, Lancashire Regiment
Major William Albany Fetherstonhaugh, Indian Army
Major Kenneth Douglas Field, Royal Garrison Artillery
Lieutenant-Colonel Robert Bainbridge Fife, Royal Garrison Artillery
Captain Lionel Hugh Knightley Finch, Cheshire Regiment
Major Arthur Francis Babington Fishe, Royal Garrison Artillery
Major Herbert George Fisher, Royal Field Artillery
Major and Brevet Lieutenant-Colonel FitzGerald Gabbett Fitzgerald, Royal Army Medical Corps
Major Peter Francis FitzGerald, Shropshire Light Infantry
Major Tudor FitzJohn, Worcestershire Regiment
Major Ernest Richard Fitzpatrick, North Lancashire Regiment
Captain and Brevet Major Victor Augustine Flower, London Regiment
Captain William Percy Stilles Foord, Gloucestershire Regiment
Major Athel Murray Hay Forbes, Royal Scots Fusiliers
Major Ronald Foster Forbes, Highland Light Infantry
Major George Norman Bowes Forster, Royal Warwickshire Regiment
Major Ronald Thomas Foster, Nottinghamshire & Derbyshire Regiment
Lieutenant-Colonel George Despard Franks, Hussars
Captain Arthur Ion Fraser, Indian Cavalry
Major Pierce Butler Fraser, Army Service Corps
Major William Humphrey May Freestun, Somerset Light Infantry
Temp Captain Laton Frewen, King's Royal Rifle Corps
Major and Brevet Lieutenant-Colonel Cuthbert Graham Fuller, Royal Engineers
Major John Frederic Charles Fuller, Oxfordshire & Buckinghamshire Light Infantry
Major John Campbell Fullerton, Royal Field Artillery
Captain Alexander Gallaher, Dragoon Guards
Lieutenant-Colonel Henry Edward Garstin, Royal Artillery
Major Gerald John Percival Geiger, Royal Welsh Fusiliers
Major and Brevet Lieutenant-Colonel Richard Walter St. Lawrance Gethin, Royal Artillery
Captain Bertrand Dees Gibson, Northumberland Fusiliers
Major Stanley Edmund Hercules Giles, Army Service Corps
Major Valentine Giles, Royal Engineers
Major Douglas Howard Gill, Royal Field Artillery
Captain Gordon Harry Gill, Army Service Corps
Temp Major Hugh James Gillespie, Royal Field Artillery
Captain and Brevet Major Reginald Henry Gillespie, Leicestershire Regiment
Major Charles Richard Gillett, Royal Artillery
Temp Major Valentine Edgar Gooderson, Highland Light Infantry
Major William Richard Power, Goodwin, Royal Army Medical Corps
Temp Lieutenant-Colonel Francis Lewis Eawson Gordon, Royal Irish Rifles
Major Henry William Gordon, Royal Engineers
Major Stewart Gore-Browne, Royal Artillery
Major Charles Rhodes Gover, Royal Artillery
Captain James Archibald Graeme, Royal Engineers
Lieutenant James Neville Gray, Special List
Major Walter Ker Gray, Royal Field Artillery
Major Hugh Annesley Gray-Cheape, Yeomanry
Major and Brevet Lieutenant-Colonel Arthur Frank Umfreville Green, Royal Artillery
Major Herbert Walter Green, East Kent Regiment
Captain Thomas Waring Bunce Greenfield, Irish Guards
Major Hugh Gilbert Gregorie, Royal Irish Regiment
Major Alfred John Reginald Gregory, Royal Garrison Artillery
Temp Lieutenant-Colonel James Grimwood, South Wales Borderers
Major Bernard Salwey Grissell, Norfolk Regiment
Lieutenant-Colonel Sir Edward Ion Beresford Grogan, Rifle Brigade
Major George Meredyth Grogan
Major Thomas Thackeray Grove, Royal Engineers
Major Percy Robert Clifford Groves, Shropshire Light Infantry
Honorary Major John Grute, Army Ordnance Depot
Temp Major Clement Henderson Gurney, York & Lancaster Regiment
Major Graham Howard Gwyther, Royal Welsh Fusiliers
Major Claude Henry Haig, Leicestershire Regiment
Major William Haig, Royal Army Medical Corps
Rev. John Percy Hales, Royal Army Chaplains' Department
Major Edward Hall, Nottinghamshire & Derbyshire Regiment
Major John Alfred Hamilton, Army Service Corps
Major Robert Townsend Hammick, Royal Artillery
Major John Connor Hanna, Royal Garrison Artillery
Major Edward Lewis Hardcastle, Royal Garrison Artillery
Lieutenant Steven James Lindsay Hardie, Argyll & Sutherland Highlanders
Temp Lieutenant-Colonel Colin Harding, Royal Warwickshire Regiment
Major Thomas Sheffield Newcombe Hardinge, Royal Garrison Artillery
Lieutenant-Colonel Reginald Stanley Hardman, Royal Field Artillery
Temp Captain John Hardress-Lloyd, Royal Inniskilling Fusiliers
Captain Eric John Hardy, Dragoons
Captain John Wilberforce Hare, Royal Garrison Artillery
Captain Alfred Harris, Royal Field Artillery
Captain Thomas Birkbeck Harris, Royal Engineers
Major George Hyde Harrison, Border Regiment
Temp Lieutenant-Colonel Geoffrey Barnett Harrison, Royal Marines
Temp Major Herbert Parsons Hart, King's Own Scottish Borderers
Major Thomas Ernest Harty, Royal Army Medical Corps
Major Francis Henry Harvey, East Yorkshire Regiment
Major William John Saundry Harvey, Royal Army Medical Corps
Major John McDougall Haskard, Royal Dublin Fusiliers
Captain and Brevet Major William Holland Hastings, Indian Army
Lieutenant-Colonel Corlis St. Leger Gillman Hawkes, Royal Field Artillery
Major William Cotter Williamson Hawkes, Indian Army
Lieutenant-Colonel Frank Hawthorn, MD, Royal Army Medical Corps
Major Arthur Kennet Hay, Royal Artillery
Major John Higson Hayes, Shropshire Yeomanry
Major Sydney Thomas Hayley, Army Ordnance Depot
Temp Major William Muir Hayman, Royal Engineers
Major Arthur Edward Maxwell Head, Royal Field Artillery
Major Charles Octavius Head, Royal Field Artillery
Major Gordon Risley Hearn, Royal Engineers
Major Harry Esmond Henderson, Royal Garrison Artillery
Captain and Brevet Major Malcolm Henderson, Royal Scots
Major Godfrey Clement Walker Heneage, 
Lieutenant-Colonel Philip Walter Beresford Henning, Royal Field Artillery
Major William Norman Herbert, Northumberland Fusiliers
Major Arnold Herklots, Army Service Corps
Major John Edward Norfor Heseltine, King's Royal Rifle Corps
Lieutenant-Colonel Henry Hewetson, Royal Army Medical Corps
Major Alfred Scott Hewitt, Royal West Kent Regiment
Temp Lieutenant-Colonel Arthur Augustus Inglis Heyman, Highland Light Infantry
Captain and Brevet Major Sir Henry Blyth Hill, 
Major Basil Alexander Hill, Army Ordnance Depot
Major Henry Warburton Hill, Royal Field Artillery
Captain William James Montagu Hill
Lieutenant-Colonel Henry Charles Rupert Hime, MB, Royal Army Medical Corps
Temp Major Henry Noel Hoare, Army Service Corps
Major Andrew Edward Hodder, MB, Royal Army Medical Corps
Captain Cyril Mindon Trower Hogg, Indian Army
Major Charles Walter Holden, Royal Army Medical Corps
Captain Henry William Holland, Special List
Captain and Brevet Major Samuel Clifford Holland, late Dragoon Guards
Captain William George Holmes, Royal Welsh Fusiliers
Major Rupert Edward Holmes à Court, Shropshire Light Infantry
Captain The Honourable Neville Albert Hood, Royal Garrison Artillery
Major Richard Hovil, Royal Field Artillery
Major Charles Alfred Howard, King's Royal Rifle Corps
Lieutenant-Colonel Francis James Leigh Howard, Army Service Corps
Captain and Brevet Major Henry Cecil Lloyd Howard, Lancers
Captain Frederick Duke Gwynne Howell, Royal Army Medical Corps
Major Reginald Howlett, Royal Fusiliers
Brevet Lieutenant-Colonel Desmond Murree FitzGerald Hoysted, Royal Engineers
Major Hubert Jervoise Huddleston, Dorsetshire Regiment
Lieutenant-Colonel Wilfrid Edward Hudleston, Royal Army Medical Corps
Major Arthur Ross Hudson, Royal Field Artillery
Captain Alfred Huggins, Royal Flying Corps
Captain Walter Backhouse Hulke, York & Lancaster Regiment, Lincolnshire Regiment
Major Charles Robert Ingham Hull, Army Service Corps
Major Granville Vere Hunt, Repair Unit, Army Service Corps
Major Thomas Massie Hutchinson, Army Service Corps
Temp Major Vernon Montgomerie Hutton, Army Service Corps
Major Robert Henry Edmund Hutton-Squire, Royal Garrison Artillery
Major Dermot Owen Hyde, MB, Royal Army Medical Corps
Captain George Bayard Hynes, Royal Artillery and Royal Flying Corps
Major Osburne Ievers, MB, Royal Army Medical Corps
Captain George Hastings Impey, Royal Sussex Regiment
Major Edward James Inches, Royal Field Artillery
Lieutenant-Colonel Charles St. Maur Ingham, Royal Field Artillery
Major and Brevet Lieutenant-Colonel John Darnley Ingles, Devonshire Regiment
Lieutenant-Colonel Edgar Thomas Inkson, Royal Army Medical Corps
Major Sydney Armitage Innes, Royal Highlanders
Major and Brevet Lieutenant-Colonel Evan Maclean Jack, Royal Engineers
Major Frank Walter Fitton Jackson, Royal Field Artillery
Captain Vivian Archer Jackson, York & Lancaster Regiment
Temp Lieutenant-Colonel Boucher Charlewood James, Devonshire Regiment
Major Cecil Polglase James, Argyll & Sutherland Highlanders
Captain Charles Frederic Jerram, Royal Marine Light Infantry
Captain Edmund Percy Johnson, Royal Field Artillery
Major Frederick Evans Johnson, Army Service Corps
Major Henry Alexander Johnson, Army Service Corps
Lieutenant James Gerald Thewlis Johnson, Yeomanry
Major John Tyrer Johnson, MB, Royal Army Medical Corps
Lieutenant-Colonel Ronald Marr Johnson, Royal Artillery
Temp Major Thomas Henry Fielder Johnson, Dorsetshire Regiment
Lieutenant-Colonel Thomas Pelham Johnson, Army Service Corps
Captain John Herbert Johnston, Royal Garrison Artillery
Captain Harry Llewellyn Jones, Hussars
Captain Howard Percy Jones, Royal Field Artillery
Captain Philip Bennet Joubert de la Ferté, Royal Artillery and Royal Flying Corps
Captain Max James Auguste Jourdier, East Surrey Regiment
El Miralai (Colonel) Beshir Kambal (Bey), Egyptian Army
Lieutenant-Colonel Sydney Keen, Royal Engineers
Major Harry Beatty Kelly, MB, Royal Army Medical Corps
Major Philip James Vandeleur Kelly, Hussars, attd. Egyptian Army
Major Waldron Harold Fletcher Kelly, Army Service Corps
Captain Henry Herbert Kemble, London Regiment
Temp Major Donald Stuart Kennedy, Army Service Corps
Captain Dennis Malcolm King, Liverpool Regiment
Temp Major Gilbert East King, East Yorkshire Regiment
Major Gerald Hartley King, Royal Artillery
Major John William Carnegie Kirk, Duke of Cornwall's Light Infantry
Lieutenant-Colonel Kenneth St. George Kirke, Royal Field Artillery
Major Travers Kirkland, Royal Field Artillery
Major Roderick Mackenzie Knolles, Royal Artillery
Lieutenant Hugh Knothe, Army Service Corps
Major and Brevet Lieutenant-Colonel Harry Hugh Sidney Knox, Northamptonshire Regiment
Major James Meldrum Knox, Royal Warwickshire Regiment
Temp Major Robert Sinclair Knox, Royal Inniskilling Fusiliers
Captain Robert Horace Koster, South Lancashire Regiment
Major Bruce Launcelot Lake, Royal Army Veterinary Corps
Major Roger Montague Radcliffe Lamb, Northumberland Fusiliers
Major Walter John Lambert, Indian Army, attd. Liverpool Regiment
Major John Frederick Paltock Langdon 
Lieutenant-Colonel James William Langstaff, Royal Army Medical Corps
Major Frank Cordon Larmour, Army Ordnance Depot
Major Ronald Hastings Lascelles, Royal Artillery
Major Walter Henry Patrick Law, Army Service Corps
Major Thomas Bernard Arthur Leahy, Army Ordnance Depot
Major Augustine Leaning, Royal Army Veterinary Corps 
Temp Captain William Rimington Ledgard, Royal Marines Artillery
Captain and Brevet Major Reginald Tilson Lee, Royal West Surrey Regiment
Temp Major Neville Leese, Army Service Corps
Major Reginald Francis Legge, Leinster Regiment
Lieutenant-Colonel William Kaye Legge, Essex Regiment
Captain Robert Anthony Cleghorn Linington Leggett, Worcestershire Regiment
Captain Charles Herbert Lemmon, Royal Field Artillery
Major Hubert Maxwell Lenox-Conyngham, Royal Army Veterinary Corps
Lieutenant-Colonel Philip Leveson-Gower, Nottinghamshire & Derbyshire Regiment
Major Claude Francis Liardet, Royal Garrison Artillery
Temp Major Charles Edward Ligertwood, MD, Royal Army Medical Corps
Major James Howard Lindsay, London Regiment
Captain Michael Egan Lindsay, Dragoon Guards
Captain Alfred Lord Lintott, London Regiment
Major Cecil Hunter Little, Somerset Light Infantry, attached Egyptian Army
Major Horace Lloyd, Northamptonshire Regiment
Major Robert Norman Lockhart, Royal Artillery
Lieutenant-Colonel Francis Douglas Logan, Royal Artillery
Major Charles Moorsom Longmore, Royal Field Artillery
Temp Major Lionel Fortescue King, Earl of Lovelace, Northumberland Fusiliers
Major Stuart Low, Royal Garrison Artillery
Major Penton Shakespear Lowis, Royal Garrison Artillery
Captain Sir Charles Bingham Lowther, Yeomanry
Major and Brevet Lieutenant-Colonel Cuthbert Henry Tindall Lucas, Royal Berkshire Regiment
Temp Major Cyril Montagu Luck, Royal Engineers
Major Frederick William Lumsden, Royal Marines Artillery
Major William Forbes Lumsden, Royal Garrison Artillery
Major Noel Luxmoore, Devonshire Regiment
Major Gordon Ponsonby MacClellan, Royal Garrison Artillery
Lieutenant-Colonel Robert Chaine Alexander McCalmont, Irish Guards
Rev. William Patrick Glyn McCormick, Royal Army Chaplains' Department
Temp Lieutenant-Colonel Sir George McCrae, Royal Scots
Major William Hew McCowan, Cameron Highlanders, employed Egyptian Army
Captain Charles Leslie Macdonald, Unattd. List, attd. Manchester Regiment
Major Edmond McDonnell, MB, Royal Army Medical Corps
Major William Allan McDougall, Royal Army Veterinary Corps
Major Charles Carlyle Macdowell, Royal Field Artillery
Major Arthur Thomas McGrath, Royal Artillery
Lieutenant-Colonel James Doull Mackay, Hampshire Regiment
Captain Colin Mansfield Mackenzie, London Regiment
Captain Donald Francis Mackenzie, MB, Royal Army Medical Corps
Lieutenant Eric Dighton Mackenzie, Scots Guards
Major John Hugh Mackenzie, Royal Scots
Major William Scobie MacKenzie, Army Ordnance Depot
Lieutenant-Colonel Frederick William Mackenzie, Royal Field Artillery
Major John Pierse Mackesy, Royal Engineers
Major James Mackinnon, Royal Army Medical Corps
Major Ernest Elliot Buckland Mackintosh, Royal Engineers
Temp Major Stanley Hugh Macintosh, Northumberland Fusiliers
Captain Donald Kenneth McLeod, Indian Army
Temp Major Francis Raymond McMahon, Royal Engineers
Temp Captain Harold Alfred MacMichael, Sudan Civil Service, attached Egyptian Army
Captain William Foster MacNeece, Royal West Kent Regiment and Royal Flying Corps
Temp Major Graham McNicoll, Durham Light Infantry
Captain Henry St. George Murray McRae, Indian Army
Temp Major Francis Samuel Needham Macrory, Royal Inniskilling Fusiliers
Major Charles Edwin McVittie, Army Service Corps
Captain Valerio Awly Magawly Cerati de Calry, Dragoons
Major Arthur Kerr Main, Royal Artillery
Lieutenant-Colonel Cecil Wilmot Mainprise, Royal Army Medical Corps
Major Mark Edward Makgill-Crighton-Maitland, Grenadier Guards
Major Charles Herbert Mallock, Royal Field Artillery
Captain Paul Copeland Maltby, Royal Welsh Fusiliers, and Royal Flying Corps
Major Wilfred Osborne Marks, Army Service Corps
Major Ronald Marryat, Royal Field Artillery
Major and Brevet Colonel Francis James Marshall, Seaforth Highlanders
Temp Captain John Dodds Marshall, MB, Royal Army Medical Corps
Major Horace de Courcy Martelli, Royal Artillery
Lieutenant-Colonel Edward Charles Massy, Royal Field Artillery
Major Edmund Byam Mathew-Lannowe, Royal West Surrey Regiment
Lieutenant-Colonel John Smart Matthew, Army Service Corps
Temp Major Harry Maud, General List
Captain Alan Hamer Maude, Army Service Corps
Major John St. Aubyn Maughan, Royal Army Medical Corps
Captain Geoffrey Archibald Prentice Maxwell, Royal Engineers
Major Mervyn Meares, Army Ordnance Depot
Lieutenant-Colonel Ernest Lennox Mears, Army Service Corps
Major Trevor Irvine-Nevitt Mears, Army Service Corps
Captain James Ross Conrad Meiklejohn, Border Regiment
Captain Alexander Henry Menzies, Highland Light Infantry
Major Christopher Henry Frank Metcalfe, Bedfordshire Regiment
Lieutenant-Colonel Fenwick Henry Metcalfe, Royal Garrison Artillery
Captain Francis Hugo Lindley Meynell, Royal Field Artillery
Major Cecil Roy Millar, Royal Army Medical Corps
Temp Captain Joseph Sidney Miller, Machine Gun Corps
Temp Captain Robert Molyneux Miller, Royal Army Medical Corps
Major John Milligan, Royal Field Artillery
Captain Arthur Mordaunt Mills, Indian Army
Major Octavius Rodney Everard Milman, Royal Garrison Artillery
Major Herbert Milward Milward, Nottinghamshire & Derbyshire Regiment
Brevet Lieutenant-Colonel John Randle Minshull Minshull-Ford, Royal Welsh Fusiliers
Captain Charles Johnstone Mitchell, Oxfordshire & Buckinghamshire Light Infantry
Temp Major James Thomson Rankin Mitchell, Royal Scots
Temp Lieutenant-Colonel Edgar Roberts Mobbs, Northamptonshire Regiment
Major Herbert Ellicombe Molesworth, Royal Garrison Artillery
Major and Brevet Lieutenant-Colonel Francis Stewart Montague-Bates, East Surrey Regiment
Major Hugh Ferguson Montgomery, Royal Marine Light Infantry
Captain Lancelot Geoffrey Moore, King's Royal Rifle Corps
Major Hubert Horatio Shirley Morant, Durham Light Infantry
Lieutenant-Colonel Edward Maudsley Morphew, Royal Army Medical Corps
Captain Henry Treise Morshead, Royal Engineers
Lieutenant-Colonel Frederick Blundell Moss-Blundell, Royal Field Artillery
Major Joseph Ernest Munby, King's Own Yorkshire Light Infantry
Captain Cyril Francis de Sales Murphy, Royal Berkshire Regiment, and Royal Flying Corps
Captain Kenelm Digby Bold Murray, Indian Army
Major Leslie Murray, Royal Warwickshire Regiment
Major Henry Lloyd Murrow, Royal Garrison Artillery
Captain Edward Osborn Armstrong Newcombe, Reserve of Officers
Major William Ashley Nicholls, Royal Field Artillery
Captain Alexander George Nicol Smith, Army Service Corps
Lieutenant-Colonel William Wylie Norman, Manchester Regiment
Major Samuel Edward Norris, Liverpool Regiment
Lieutenant Thomas Walker Nott, Gloucestershire Regiment
Major Edward Bunbury North, Royal Fusiliers
Lieutenant-Colonel Herbert John Nutt, Royal Warwickshire Regiment
Rev. Maurice O'Connell, Royal Army Chaplains' Department
Major Arthur Radulphus Oldfield, Army Ordnance Depot
Captain George Milner Ormerod, Royal Field Artillery
Rev. Benjamin Garniss O'Rorke, MA, Royal Army Chaplains' Department
Major Darrell Ovey, Rifle Brigade
Major Edmund Christopher Packe, Royal Fusiliers
Major Lewis Meadows Shaw Page, Army Service Corps
Major Santiago Luis-Pallant, Royal Army Medical Corps
Major Samuel Farrer Godfrey Pallin, Royal Army Veterinary Corps
Major William Parker, London Regiment
Temp Captain William Newton Parker, MD, Royal Army Medical Corps
Lieutenant-Colonel Claud Frederick Pillington Parry, Royal Field Artillery
Captain Cecil Parsons, Royal West Surrey Regiment
Lieutenant-Colonel Durie Parsons, Army Service Corps
Major Arthur William Sibbald Paterson, Somerset Light Infantry, attached Royal Irish Fusiliers
Major William Pattinson Paynter, Royal Artillery
Major Sidney Arthur Pearse, Indian Army, attended East Lancashire Regiment
Major Sydney Capel Peck, Royal Artillery
Captain Ryland Talbot Pemberton, Army Service Corps
Temp Major Hubert Stanley-Whitmore Pennington, Army Service Corps
Major Arthur Francis Gore Pery-Knox-Gore, Army Service Corps
Captain Thomas Henry Peyton, Royal Army Medical Corps
Major Brian Surtees Phillpotts, Royal Engineers
Captain Emil William Pickering, Royal Field Artillery
Captain Francis Alexander Umfreville Pickering, Dragoons
Major Francis Stewart Gilderoy Piggott, Royal Engineers
Captain William Spilman Pilcher, Grenadier Guards
Captain Guy Reginald Pilkington, South Lancashire Regiment
Lieutenant-Colonel Edmund Walker Penny Pinkney, Army Service Corps
Lieutenant-Colonel The Honourable Stuart Pleydell-Bouverie, Royal Field Artillery
Captain John George Latham Pleydell-Nott, Army Service Corps
Captain Kelburne Archibald Plimpton, East Yorkshire Regiment
Lieutenant-Colonel Charles Edward Pollock, Royal Army Medical Corps
Temp Major George Paton Pollitt, Royal Engineers
Major Edward Alexander Pope, South Wales Borderers
Captain Francis Pope, Northamptonshire Regiment
Major and Brevet Lieutenant-Colonel Hubert Cecil Potter, Liverpool Regiment
Major William Allen Potter, Army Service Corps
Major Robert Montagu Powell, Royal Artillery
Lieutenant William Henry Powell, Royal Field Artillery
Major Hugh Stainton Poyntz, Bedfordshire Regiment
Temp Captain Kenneth Elliston Poyser, Yorkshire Light Infantry
Captain Thomas Wykeham Pragnell, Hussars
Major Audley Charles Pratt, Royal Inniskilling Fusiliers
Captain Robert Edward Burton Pratt, Royal Engineers
Captain and Brevet Major Frank Preedy, Royal Engineers
Lieutenant-Colonel Alfred Frederick Prechtel, Royal Field Artillery
Temp Lieutenant-Colonel Charies Frederick Pretor-Pinney, Rifle Brigade
Major and Brevet Lieutenant-Colonel Thomas Herbert Francis Price, Duke of Cornwall's Light Infantry
Major Thomas Rose Caradoc Price, Welsh Guards
Major and Brevet Lieutenant-Colonel Geoffrey Robert Pridham, Royal Engineers
Major and Brevet Lieutenant-Colonel Hall Grant Pringle, Royal Field Artillery
Major Clive Gordon Pritchard, Royal Garrison Artillery
Lieutenant-Colonel Charles William Profeit, MB, Army Medical Service
Lieutenant-Colonel Harold Vernon Prynne, Royal Army Medical Corps
Temp Major Bruce Hale Puckle, Machine Gun Corps
Captain William Brooke Purdon,  MB, Royal Army Medical Corps
Major Lydmar Moline Purser, MB, Royal Army Medical Corps
Captain Kellow William Pye, Royal Engineers
Temp Major Douglas Quirk, York & Lancaster Regiment
Captain Archibald Gordon Rainsford-Hannay, Royal Engineers, employed Egyptian Army
Major Frederick Rainsford-Hannay, Royal Field Artillery
Major Algernon Forbes Randolph, Suffolk Regiment
Lieutenant-Colonel Wilson Ranson, Royal Army Medical Corps
Major Matthew Burrow Ray, Royal Army Medical Corps
Captain John James Read, Royal Field Artillery
Major Robert James Rees-Mogg, Royal Irish Regiment, employed Egyptian Army
Lieutenant-Colonel William John Kerr Rettie, Royal Field Artillery
Captain Godfrey Dean Rhodes, Royal Engineers
Major Henry George Ricardo, Royal Field Artillery (retired)
Major Harold Arthur David Richards, Army Service Corps
Lieutenant-Colonel Percy Edward Ricketts, Indian Army
Major Arthur Wilmot Rickman, Northumberland Fusiliers
Major John Herbert Ridgway, North Staffordshire Regiment
Captain Crescent Gebhard Risley, Indian Army
Major Theodore Francis Ritchie, MB, Royal Army Medical Corps
Major Arthur Henry Roberts, Army Service Corps
Major Charles Chetwode Robertson, Royal Field Artillery
Major Norman Bethune Robertson, Royal Field Artillery
Major William Robertson, Royal Engineers
Major Archibald Tyrrell Robinson, East Surrey Regiment, attached Oxfordshire & Buckinghamshire Light Infantry
Temp Lieutenant-Colonel Beverly Beverly Robinson, Yorkshire Light Infantry
Honorary Major and Honorary Lieutenant-Colonel Edward Heaton Robinson, Army Ordnance Depot
Major Frederick Winwood Robinson, Royal Field Artillery
Major Leonard John Whishaw Robinson, Royal Field Artillery
Major and Brevet Lieutenant-Colonel Stratford Watson Robinson, Royal Artillery
Major William Pasley Robinson, Army Service Corps
Lieutenant-Colonel Horace Samson Roch, Royal Army Medical Corps
Major Henry Schofield Rogers, Royal Engineers
Captain Hugh Henry Rogers, Royal Artillery (retired)
Temp Lieutenant-Colonel George Rollo, Liverpool Regiment
Captain Stanley Percy Ashby Rolls, Dorsetshire Regiment
Major Cresswell Paillet Rooke, Middlesex Regiment
Major Alexander Macgregor Rose, MB, Royal Army Medical Corps
Temp Lieutenant-Colonel Hugh Arthur Rose, Royal Scots
Major Hugh Alexander Leslie Rose, Royal Artillery
Major Walter Mytton Royston-Pigott, Army Service Corps
Lieutenant-Colonel Henry John Russell, Army Service Corps
Captain James Cosmo Russell, Indian Army
Major William Chambers Pomeroy Russell, Royal Garrison Artillery
Major William Kelson Russell, Royal Engineers
Captain George James Paul St. Clair, Royal Artillery
Major Edmund Farquhar St. John, Royal Artillery
Lieutenant-Colonel Frederick Dudley Samuel, London Regiment
Temp Major Frederick Alfaro Samuel, Royal Welsh Fusiliers
Major Vincent Corbett Sandilands, Scottish Rifles
Captain Arthur Edward Every Sargent, Indian Army
Lieutenant Percy William George Sargent, MB , Army Medical Service
Captain Harold Cecil Rich Saunders, East Yorkshire Regiment
Major Gerald Tahourdin Savage, Army Service Corps
Major Lawrence Wrey Savile, Royal Artillery
Temp Major Arnold Kenneth Malcolm Cecil Wordsworth Savory, East Yorkshire Regiment
Major George Adinston McLaren Sceales, Argyll & Sutherland Highlanders
Major Charles Alexander Reid Scott, Royal Artillery
Temp Captain Ernest Scott, MB, Royal Army Medical Corps
Major John Willoughby Scott, Yeomanry
Temp Major Robert Hamilton Scott, Royal Inniskilling Fusiliers
Lieutenant-Colonel Tom Ogle Seagram, Royal Field Artillery
Major Douglas Thorne Seckham, South Staffordshire Regiment
Lieutenant-Corporal Herbert Spencer Seligman, Royal Artillery
Major Archibald George Seymour, Dragoons
Captain Edward Seymour, Grenadier Guards
Lieutenant-Colonel Daniel David Shanahan, Royal Army Medical Corps
Major Gordon Donald Archibald Shaw, Royal Field Artillery
Major Basil Heron Shaw-Stewart, Royal Artillery
Captain Robert Shelton, Army Service Corps
Lieutenant-Colonel James Donnelly Sherer, Royal Garrison Artillery
Lieutenant-Colonel John Payzant Silver, MB, Royal Army Medical Corps
Temp Major Charles Thomas Simcox, Duke of Cornwall's Light Infantry
Temp Major Percy Reginald Owen Abel Sinmer, West Riding Regiment
Captain John de Luze Simonds, Royal Garrison Artillery
Lieutenant-Colonel Percy Cyriac Burrell Skinner, Northamptonshire Regiment
Temp Lieutenant-Colonel Edgar Smalley, Manchester Regiment
Lieutenant-Colonel George Edward Smith, Royal Engineers
Rev. Canon Martin Linton Smith, DD, Royal Army Chaplains' Department
Major Sidney Smith, Royal Field Artillery and Royal Flying Corps
Major George Nowell Thomas Smyth-Osbourne, Devonshire Regiment
Captain Denis Mavisyn Anslow Sole, Border Regiment
Major Trevor Lloyd Blunden Soutry, Royal Irish Rifles
Lieutenant-Colonel Gilbert Ormerod Spence, Durham Light Infantry
Major Charlton Watson Spinks, Royal Artillery, employed Egyptian Army
Staff Surgeon Charles Edward Cortis Stanford, MB , Royal Naval Division 
Captain and Brevet Major The Honourable Frederick William Stanley, Royal Artillery, Hussars
Major Nigel Austin Stebbing, Royal Field Artillery
Major Arthur William Stericker, Duke of Cornwall's Light Infantry
Major Arthur Cornish Jeremie Stevens, Royal Engineers
Major Cecil Mordant Henry Stevens, Royal Artillery
Major Harold Raphael Gaetano Stevens, Royal Garrison Artillery
Major Leighton Marlow Stevens, Worcestershire Regiment
Captain Percival Henry Stevenson, King's Own Scottish Borderers
Major Douglas Stewart, Royal Field Artillery
Major William Stirling, Royal Field Artillery
Major Ernest Norman Stockley, Royal Engineers
Temp Major Harris Lawrence Stocks, Royal Scots
Lieutenant-Colonel Thomas Richard Stokoe, Duke of Cornwall's Light Infantry
Captain and Brevet Major Percy Vere Powys Stone, Norfolk Regiment
Temp Major Philip Francis Story, Royal Engineers
Major The Honourable Edward Plantagenet Joseph Corbally Stourton, Yorkshire Light Infantry
Major Cyril Edwin Stranack, Royal Artillery
Captain Frederick John Martin Stratton, Royal Engineers
Captain Guy Clifford Stubbs, Suffolk Regiment
Major John Orlando Summerhayes, Royal Army Medical Corps
Temp Major Frank Summers, Machine Gun Corps
Major and Brevet Lieutenant-Colonel William Frederick Sweny, Royal Fusiliers
Major Donald Cuthbertson Sword, Scottish Rifles
Major Mark Synge, Supply and Transport Corps, Indian Army
Captain Thomas George Taylor, Gordon Highlanders
Major Alfred Temperley, Northumberland Fusiliers
Major and Brevet Lieutenant-Colonel Roger Stephen Tempest, Scots Guards
Major William Percival Cosnahan Tenison, Royal Artillery
Captain Frank Stanford Thackeray, Highland Light Infantry
Lieutenant-Colonel Albert George Thompson, MB, Royal Army Medical Corps
Major and Brevet Lieutenant-Colonel Richard Lovell Brereton Thompson, Royal Engineers
Captain Stephen John Thompson, Royal Field Artillery
Major Charles Glendenning Thomson, Royal Army Medical Corps
Major Austin Thorp, Royal Garrison Artillery
Major Harold Thorpe, Yeomanry
Major and Brevet Colonel Edward Ivan de Sausmarez Thorpe, Bedfordshire Regiment
Major Lionel Victor Thurston, Royal Army Medical Corps
Major Guy Thwaites, Army Service Corps, employed Egyptian Army
Major Lord Alexander George Thynne, Yeomanry
Lieutenant-Colonel Norman Eccles Tilney, Royal Artillery
Major Francis Martin Tomkinson, Worcestershire Regiment
Major James Newman Townsend, Royal Warwickshire Regiment
Major William Henry Traill, East Lancashire Regiment
Temp Major Reginald Graham Trower, Royal Engineers
Major Charles Montagu Truman, Lancers
Captain Frederick Joseph Trump, Monmouthshire Regiment
Major George Francis Stratford Tuke, Royal Artillery
Major and Brevet Lieutenant-Colonel Ernest Vere Turner, Royal Engineers
Major John Earner Turner, Scottish Rifles
Major John Lannoy Forbes Tweedie, Gloucestershire Regiment, attached Lancashire Fusiliers
Major William Cecil Erasmus Twidale, Royal Artillery
Captain and Brevet Major Edward Kemble Twiss, Indian Army
Major Francis Arthur Twiss, Royal Artillery
Major and Brevet Lieutenant-Colonel Archibald George Brabazon Urmston
Captain Archibald Tito le Marchant Utterson, Leicestershire Regiment
Major Freegift William Van der Kiste, Royal Garrison Artillery
Major Thomas Boyle Vandeleur, Royal Irish Regiment
Temp Major Paul Cairn Vellacott, South Lancashire Regiment
Temp Lieutenant-Colonel Arthur Neville Vince, Liverpool Regiment
Lieutenant-Colonel Henry Oswald Wade, West Yorkshire Regiment
Lieutenant-Colonel Thomas Stewart Herschal Wade, Lancashire Fusiliers
Major Thomas Montague Wakefield, Royal Artillery
Major John Crosby Walch, Royal Field Artillery
Major Henry West Walker, Royal Artillery
Captain William Herbert Walker, Royal Army Veterinary Corps
Lieutenant-Colonel Frederick William Henry Walshe, Royal Artillery
Major Charles Lawrence Tyndall Walwyn, Royal Artillery
Major William Melvill Warburton, Royal Field Artillery
Major Hugh Fawcett Warden, Royal West Surrey Regiment
Major John Waring, Royal Artillery
Major Robert Baker Warton, Royal Artillery
Major Hugh Branston Warwick, Army Ordnance Depot
Lieutenant-Colonel Francis Wyatt Watling, Royal Engineers
Lieutenant-Colonel Andrew Alexander Watson, Royal Army Medical Corps
Lieutenant-Colonel Brian Watts, Royal Army Medical Corps
Lieutenant-Colonel Benjamin Irby Way, North Staffordshire Regiment
Captain and Brevet Major George Ambrose Congreve Webb, Reserve of Officers
Major Kenneth Charles Weldon, Royal Dublin Fusiliers
Major Harry Harris Were, Reserve of Officers
Major Alexander Henry Delap West, Royal Artillery
Major Francis George West, Royal Artillery
Major John Leslie Weston, Army Service Corps
Major Herbert Laurence Wethered, Army Ordnance Depot
Majot Cyril Moreton Wheatley, General List
Major Robert Henry Whitcombe, Army Service Corps
Temp Major Arthur Charles White, Yorkshire Light Infantry
Major George Frederick Charles White, Royal Artillery
Captain Oliver Woodhouse White, Dorsetshire Regiment
Lieutenant-Colonel Wilfred James Whitehead, London Regiment
Lieutenant-Colonel Francis Henry Douglas Charlton Whitmore, Yeomanry
Major and Brevet Lieutenant-Colonel Edgar Askin Wiggin
Major and Brevet Lieutenant-Colonel Kenneth Wigram, Indian Army
Captain Charles Joseph Wiley, Royal Irish Rifles
Major Edmund Ernest Wilford, Indian Army
Captain Charles Leyburn Wilkinson, Royal Field Artillery
Major Henry Benfield Des Voeux Wilkinson, Durham Light Infantry
Captain George Thomas Wilian, Home Counties Field Ambulance, Royal Army Medical Corps
Captain John Condliff Modesley Williams, Royal Field Artillery
Major and Brevet Lieutenant-Colonel Arthur Harry Hutton Wilson, Wiltshire Regiment
Major Alexander Moreton Wilson, Army Service Corps
Lieutenant-Colonel George Tyrie Brand Wilson, Argyll & Sutherland Highlanders, attached King's Own Scottish Borderers
Major Henry Maitland Wilson, Rifle Brigade
Temp Major William Herbert Wilson, Royal Field Artillery
Major Maurice Guy Winder, Royal Army Medical Corps
Major Basil Fenton Wingate, Royal Army Medical Corps
Major Rev. William Edward Wingfield, Royal Field Artillery
Temp Lieutenant-Colonel Edward Allan Wood, Shropshire Light Infantry
Captain Hugo Kenneth Stuart Woodhouse, Liverpool Regiment
Major Richard Nason Woodley, Royal Army Medical Corps
Captain Max Woods, South Lancashire Regiment
Temp Major Philip James Woods, 9th Battalion, Royal Irish Rifles
Captain and Brevet Major Rivers Berney Worgan, Indian Army
Major Geoffrey Raymond Worthington-Wilmer, Scottish Rifles, employed Egyptian Army
Major Edward Martyn Woulfe Flanagan, East Surrey Regiment
Captain William Gordon Wright, Royal Army Medical Corps
Captain Ernest Robert Caldwell Wyatt, Indian Army
Captain Richard Owen Wynne, Bedfordshire Regiment
Major Ralph Maximilian Yorke, Yeomanry
Major Herbert Nugent Young, Royal Inniskilling Fusiliers
Lieutenant-Colonel Walter Herbert Young, Yorkshire Regiment
Temp Captain William Allan Young, MB, Royal Army Medical Corps
Major George Udny Yule, Royal Engineers
Major William Dent Bewsher, Reserve of Officers
Captain Frederick Cromie De Butts, Indian Army
Major Charles Victor Isacks, Army Pay Department
Captain Herbert John Mackenzie, Indian Army
Temp. Captain Peter Norman Nissen, Royal Engineers
2nd Lieutenant John Sanderson Poole, King's Royal Rifle Corps
Lieutenant-Colonel Richard Elmslie Ramsden, Royal Field Artillery 
Captain Alexander Whitmore Colquhoun Richardson, Bedfordshire Regiment
Major Percy Gotch Robinson, Royal Artillery
Major Henry Storr, Reserve of Officers
Major Henry Innes-Storey, Devonshire Regiment
Captain William Wyndham Torre Torr, West Yorkshire Regiment
Major Stuart Harman Joseph Thunder, Northamptonshire Regiment
Captain Arthur Lucius Wilford, Indian Army
Major and Brevet Lieutenant-Colonel Herbert Edward Winsloe, Royal Engineers
Captain Ronald Henry Warton Worsley, King's Own Scottish Borderers, attached Egyptian Army

Australian Imperial Force
Lieutenant-Colonel Stuart Milligan Anderson, Australian Field Artillery
Lieutenant-Colonel Frederick William Gadsby Annand, Australian Pioneer Battalion
Lieutenant-Colonel George Walter Barber, Australian Army Medical Corps
Major Thomas Albert Blamey, Commonwealth Military Forces
Major Stephen Bruggy, Commonwealth Military Forces
Lieutenant-Colonel James William Clark
Lieutenant-Colonel Harold Edward Cohen, Australian Field Artillery
Lieutenant-Colonel Herbert Brayley Collett
Lieutenant-Colonel Graham Coulter
Lieutenant-Colonel Walter Adams Coxen, Australian Field Artillery
Lieutenant-Colonel Herbert James Cox-Taylor, Australian Field Artillery
Major Clarence Wells Didier Daly
Major Francis Plumley Derham, Field Artillery Brigade, Australian Field Artillery
Major Joseph Espie Dods, Australian Army Medical Corps
Lieutenant-Colonel James Murdoch Archer Durrant
Captain Andrew James Dwyer
Major Richard John Dyer, Australian Engineers
Lieutenant-Colonel Charles Hazell Elliott
Major Daniel Edward Evans, Australian Engineers
Lieutenant-Colonel George Andrew Ferguson
Lieutenant-Colonel Wilfrid Kent Fethers
Lieutenant-Colonel Albert Cecil Fewtrell
Lieutenant-Colonel Frederick William Dempster Forbes
Major Henry Kenneth Fry, Australian Army Medical Corps
Lieutenant-Colonel Colin Dunmore Fuller, Australian Light Horse Regiment
Major Grosvenor George Stuart Gordon, Australian Engineers
Lieutenant-Colonel William Grant, Australian Light Horse Regiment
Major Frank Harbottle, Australian Field Artillery
Lieutenant-Colonel Charles Henry William Hardy, Australian Army Medical Corps
Captain Douglas Rawson Harris, Australian Field Artillery
Major Frank le Leu Henley, Australian Army Service Corps
Lieutenant-Colonel Sydney Charles Edgar Herring
Lieutenant-Colonel Owen Glendower Howell-Price, 
Lieutenant-Colonel Francis Augustus Hughes, Australian Field Artillery
Lieutenant-Colonel Carl Herman Jess
Major Arthur Harold Keith Jopp, Australian Field Artillery
Lieutenant-Colonel Herbert Thomas Christopher Layh
Captain Cyril McEachern Lillie
Major Daniel Aston Luxton, Australian Infantry
Lieutenant-Colonel David McFie McConaghy, 
Major George St. John Fancourt McDonald, Australian Field Artillery
Lieutenant-Colonel Iven Giffard Mackay
Lieutenant-Colonel William Kenneth Seaforth Mackenzie
Captain George Charles Magenis
Lieutenant-Colonel Charles Henry Ernest Manning, Australian Army Service Corps
Major Alexander Hammett Marks, Australian Army Medical Corps
Lieutenant-Colonel Edward Fowell Martin
Lieutenant-Colonel John Baldwin Meredith, Australian Light Horse Regiment
Major Charles Gordon Norman Miles, Australian Divisional Artillery
Rev. Frederic James Miles, Australian Army Chaplains' Department
Major Stanley Lynall Milligan
Major Edmund James Houghton Nicholson, Australian Pioneer Battalion
Major Hector Alexander Nugent, Australian Army Service Corps
Lieutenant-Colonel George Macleay Macarthur Onslow, Australian Light Horse Regiment
Lieutenant-Colonel Owen Forbes Phillips, Australian Field Artillery
Lieutenant-Colonel John Hare Phipps, Australian Army Medical Corps
Major Eric Clive Pegus Plant
Major Ernest George Radford, Australian Machine Gun Corps
Lieutenant-Colonel Alexander Windeyer Ralston
Major John Cecil Thomas Edmund Charles Ridley, Australian Light Horse Regiment
Lieutenant-Colonel Stephen Richard Roberts, Australian Infantry
Major David Thompson Rogers, Australian Field Artillery
Lieutenant-Colonel Thomas Gordon Ross, Australian Army Medical Corps
Major William Howard St. Clair, Australian Field Artillery
Lieutenant-Colonel Charles Gordon Shaw, Australian Army Medical Corps
Lieutenant-Colonel Robert Smith
Lieutenant-Colonel George Cattell Somerville, Staff
Major Alexander Steele, Australian Machine Gun Company
Lieutenant-Colonel James Campbell Stewart
Major Vernon Asleton Hobart Sturdee, Australian Engineers
Lieutenant-Colonel Herbert James Cox Taylor, Australian Field Artillery
Lieutenant-Colonel Frederick William Toll
Major Theodore Friederick Ulrich
Major Horace George Viney, Light Horse Regiment
Lieutenant-Colonel James Walker
Lieutenant-Colonel Stanley Price Weir
Lieutenant-Colonel John Basil St. Vincent Welch, Australian Army Medical Corps
Captain Leslie Charles Whitfeld, Australian Army Veterinary Corps
Major William McKenzie Young

Canadian Forces
Major Ronald Okeden Alexander, Canadian Infantry
Major Merrill Vincent Allen, Canadian Mounted Rifles
Major and Brevet Lieutenant-Colonel William Beaumont Anderson, Canadian Engineers
Major William Andrewes, Canadian Infantry
Lieutenant-Colonel Ralph Craven Andros, Canadian Mounted Rifles Battalion
Major Frank Farquier Arnoldi, Canadian Field Artillery
Major Walter Mackie Balfour, Canadian Mounted Rifles Battalion
Major John Clement Ball, Canadian Field Artillery
Major William Gilbert Beeman, Canadian Artillery
Lieutenant-Colonel Arthur Henry Bell, Canadian Infantry
Lieutenant-Colonel Charles Edward Bent, Canadian Infantry
Major William Robert Bertram, Canadian Infantry
Major Henry Eversley Boak, Royal Canadian Horse Artillery
Lieutenant-Colonel Russell Hubert Britton, Canadian Field Artillery
Captain Lawrence Newsam Beverley Bullock, Canadian Engineers
Lieutenant-Colonel George Stephen Cantlie, Canadian Infantry
Lieutenant-Colonel Henry Gurney Carscallen, Canadian Field Artillery
Major Charles Francis Constantine, Royal Canadian Horse Artillery
Temp Major Charles Arthur Corrigan, Canadian Army Service Corps
Lieutenant-Colonel John Jennings Creelman, Canadian Field Artillery
Major Ludger Jules Oliver Daly-Gingras, Canadian Infantry
Temp. Major Angus Ward Davis, Canadian Engineers
Major Arthur Édouard Dubuc, Canadian Infantry
Lieutenant-Colonel William Henri de la Tour d'Auvergne Findlay, Canadian Army Service Corps
Major Karl Creighton Folger, Canadian Ordnance Company
Major James Wallace Forbes, Canadian Infantry
Lieutenant-Colonel Frederick Arthur de Long Gascoigne, Canadian Infantry
Lieutenant-Colonel Harry Augustus Genet, Canadian Infantry
Temp Lieutenant-Colonel William Waring Primrose Gibsone, Canadian Divisional Headquarters
Lieutenant-Colonel Harry Duncan Lockhart Gordon, Canadian Mounted Infantry
Lieutenant-Colonel John Alexander Gunn, Canadian Infantry
Major Hugh Walter Harbord, Canadian Mounted Rifles
Major Frederick Owen Hodgins, Canadian Engineers
Lieutenant-Colonel Thomas Fraser Homer-Dixon, Lord Strathcona's Horse
Lieutenant-Colonel William St. Pierre Hughes, Canadian Infantry
Major Bernard Maynard Humble, Canadian Infantry
Lieutenant-Colonel Elmer Watson Jones, Canadian Infantry
Major Terence Percival Jones, Canadian Infantry
Major Walter Frederick Kemp, Canadian Infantry
Lieutenant-Colonel James Kirkcaldy, Canadian Infantry
Lieutenant-Colonel George Eric McCraig, Canadian Infantry
Major Eric Whidden MacDonald, Canadian Infantry
Major James Alexander Macdonell, Canadian Infantry
Major Alan Brettell McEwen, Canadian Divisional Artillery
Lieutenant-Colonel Archibald Ernest Graham McKenzie, Canadian Infantry
Major John Percival MacKenzie, Canadian Infantry
Major John Angus McDonald, Canadian Field Artillery
Major Bartlett McLennan, Canadian Infantry
Captain William Edward Manhard, Canadian Engineers
Lieutenant-Colonel Henry Linton Milligan, Canadian Infantry
Major Gordon Fraser Morrison, Canadian Infantry
Major Frank Stanley Morrison, Royal Canadian Dragoons
Major Lionel Frank Page, Canadian Infantry
Major Robert Henry Palmer, Canadian Infantry
Major Johnson Lindsay Rowlett Parsons, Canadian Infantry
Major Thomas Edward Powers, Canadian Divisional Signal Company
Major Barry Wentworth Roscoe, Canadian Mounted Rifles
Major John Munro Ross, Canadian Infantry
Lieutenant-Colonel Lorne Ross, Canadian Infantry
Lieutenant-Colonel John Arthur Shaw, Canadian Army Service Corps
Temp Colonel Arthur Evans Snell, Canadian Army Medical Corps
Lieutenant-Colonel John Smith Stewart, Canadian Field Artillery
Lieutenant-Colonel Thomas-Louis Tremblay, Canadian Infantry
Major Paul Frederick Villiers, Canadian Infantry
Major Francis Bethel Ware, Canadian Infantry
Lieutenant-Colonel William Webster, Canadian Army Medical Corps
Lieutenant-Colonel Robert Percy Wright, Canadian Army Medical Corps

New Zealand Force
Lieutenant-Colonel William Henry Cunningham
Lieutenant-Colonel John Findlay, Canterbury Mounted Rifles
Major Francis Henry Lampen, New Zealand Staff Corps
Lieutenant-Colonel Charles Ernest Randolph Mackesy, Auckland Mounted Rifles
Major Clyde McGilp, New Zealand Field Artillery
Major Alexander George McKenzie
Lieutenant-Colonel William Meldrum, Wellington Mounted Rifles Regiment
Lieutenant-Colonel Charles William Melvill, New Zealand Rifle Brigade
Lieutenant-Colonel Donald Norman Watson Murray, New Zealand Medical Corps
Major James Pow, New Zealand Rifle Brigade
Captain Victor Rogers, New Zealand Field Artillery
Major Conrad Gordon Saxby, New Zealand Pioneer Battalion
Major Robert Barrington Smythe, New Zealand Signal Company
Lieutenant-Colonel Alexander Edward Stewart, New Zealand Rifle Brigade
Major John Studholme, Canterbury Mounted Rifles

South African Contingent
Temp Major Walter Brydon, South African Heavy Artillery
Major Norman Harrison, South African Engineers
Major Donald McLeay Macleod, South African Infantry
Temp Major Michael Stanislaus Power, South African Medical Corps

In recognition of bravery and devotion to duty during mine-sweeping operations —
Commander Hugh Seymour,  
Lieutenant-Commander Leslie Drew Fisher,  
Lieutenant-Commander Daniel McDowell, 

For valuable services rendered in connection with the War —
Captain James Molesworth Blair, Gordon Highlanders 
Captain Malcolm Grahame Christie, Royal Flying Corps
Major George Arthur Harris, Unattached List
Major John Fraser Neilson, Hussars 
Temp. Major Ivon Henry Price, Special List
Captain Arthur Holmes Quibell, Nottinghamshire & Derbyshire Regiment 
Captain Frank Rayner, Nottinghamshire & Derbyshire Regiment 
Major Sir Thomas Anderson Salt, late Hussars 
Major Harold Fownes Somerville, Rifle Brigade

Citations: In recognition of their services —
Commander Frederick Edward Ketelbey Strong, . For the successful manner in which he conducted HMS Dwarfs actions, with the armed yacht Herzogin Elisabeth, Joss Battery, and the armed vessel Nachtigal, on 9, 11 and 16 September 1914, respectively, as well as other important duties, which on several occasions brought him into contact with the enemy during the Cameroon's Campaign.
Commander Francis Henry Grenfell,  
Commander Herbert Charles Valentine Beresford Cheetham, Royal Naval Reserve. As Chief Transport Officer with the Cameroon's Expeditionary Force, Cdr. Cheetham performed exceptional service under a heavy fire during the attacks on Jabassi on 8 October 1914, and in the subsequent embarkation of troops and retirement down stream of the flotilla after dark. He commanded the advanced detachments of the Nyong flotilla on the Edea expedition, driving out a hostile party from Dehane, and thereby enabling the French troops to land without opposition.
Lieutenant-Commander Arthur Alured Mellin,  
Lieutenant-Commander John de Burgh Jessop, . In recognition of the skill and determination which he showed in making a successful submarine attack on an enemy light cruiser on 19 October 1916.
Lieutenant-Commander Henry George Gardiner Westmore, Royal Naval Reserve
Lieutenant-Commander John Percival, Royal Naval Reserve. Lieutenant-Commander Percival was acting director of Nigeria Marine at the commencement of hostilities in the Cameroons, and was largely responsible, for the efficient manner in which the Nigeria Marine vessels were fitted out for duty with the expedition. He also performed valuable service as King's Harbour Master at Duala from 28 September to 14 December 1914, when he was appointed Director of Nigeria Marine at Lagos, in which position he invariably assisted the Senior Naval officer in every way possible throughout the campaign.

In recognition of services in the Battle of Jutland —
Fleet Surgeon Ernest Alfred Penfold, MB, . Was in the fore medical distributing station when a heavy shell burst just outside, killing and wounding many. He was knocked down, bruised and shaken, but personally assisted in the removal of the wounded and tended them with unremitting skill and devotion for 40 hours without rest. His example was invaluable in keeping up the morale of the wounded and of the medical party under very trying conditions, the shell having, destroyed instruments, dressings, etc.
Commander John Coombe Hodgson, . Led Destroyer attack on enemy Battle Cruisers, but, becoming engaged with enemy Destroyers, was unable to get within range. On conclusion of gun attack, in which several hostile Destroyers were sunk and the enemy beaten off, he attacked enemy Battle Fleet and fired four torpedoes under very hot fire of enemy Battleships secondary armament. His Destroyer was struck and damaged by a shell.
Lieutenant-Commander Evelyn Claude Ogilvie Thomson, .  Senior Officer of a Division of Destroyers, and having defeated the enemy Destroyers, gallantly pressed home attack with torpedoes on enemy Battle Cruisers.
Captain Harold Blount, Royal Marine Artillery. Performed excellent service as officer of Q Turret on 31 May, as well as in the action off Heligoland in August 1914, and at the Dogger Bank in January 1915.

In recognition of their gallantry and devotion to duty in the Field —
Captain Aylmer Gustavus Clerk, Hertfordshire Regiment. For conspicuous gallantry in action. He led his company in the attack with great courage and initiative. He organised the consolidation of the captured position under heavy fire. On another occasion he repelled an enemy counter-attack. He set a splendid example throughout the operations.
Temp Lieutenant-Commander Bernard Henry Ellis, Royal Naval Volunteer Reserve. For conspicuous gallantry in action.
Temp Captain Christopher Garrett Elkington, Gloucestershire Regiment.  For conspicuous gallantry in action. With six men he attacked and silenced an enemy machine gun. Later, he displayed great courage and ability in organising the defence of the position. He was twice wounded, but remained at duty directing operations until he was again severely wounded.
Captain Cecil Champagne Herbert-Stepney, King's Royal Rifle Corps, attached Nottinghamshire & Derbyshire Regiment. For conspicuous gallantry in action. He went forward under intense fire to ascertain that consolidation was proceeding satisfactorily. His preparations for the attack, and his action throughout the assembly, contributed very largely to the success of the operations.
Major Thomas David Murray, Hampshire Regiment, attached Royal Highlanders, temporarily attached Cambridgeshire Regiment. For conspicuous gallantry in action. He showed great skill and resource in handling his battalion over a very extended front and over a very difficult country. He seized all his objective, took many prisoners, and eventually consolidated the position won.
Temp Captain Dyfrig Huws Pennant, Royal Army Medical Corps, attached Headquarters, Royal Field Artillery. For conspicuous gallantry and devotion to duty. He dressed and remained with three wounded men under the most intense fire. He has at all times set a splendid example of courage and coolness, and has on many occasions done fine work.
Temp Lieutenant Walter Sterndale-Bennett, Royal Naval Volunteer Reserve. For conspicuous gallantry in action. He assumed command of and handled his battalion with marked courage and ability. He personally collected a party and bombed the enemy out of part of their second line, where they might have held up the attack.

Awarded a Bar to the Distinguished Service Order (DSO*)
Commander Noel Frank Laurence, . In recognition of the skill and determination which he showed in making a successful submarine attack on an enemy Battle Squadron on 5 November 1916.
Lieutenant William Henry Stanway, Royal Welsh Fusiliers, attached Cheshire Regiment. For conspicuous gallantry in action. He handled his battalion in the attack with great courage and ability. He captured the position, inflicted much loss on the enemy, and took a large number of prisoners.

Distinguished Service Cross (DSC)

Flight Lieutenant Ernest William Norton, Royal Naval Air Service. In recognition of his skill and gallantry in destroying a German kite balloon on 20 October 1916, under severe anti-aircraft fire.
Surgeon Hother McCormack Hanschell, Royal Navy. In recognition of his services with the Tanganyika Flotilla. The comparative immunity from sickness enjoyed by the members of the expedition was due to the unremitting care bestowed by Surgeon Hanschell on the health of the personnel and on the sanitary state of the camps and vessels.
Lieutenant Arthur Darville Dudley, Royal Naval Volunteer Reserve. In recognition of his services with the Tanganyika Flotilla. He showed great coolness and skill in handling his ship in all circumstances.
Sub-Lieutenant Guy Trevarton Sholl, Royal Naval Volunteer Reserve. In recognition of his services in charge of a squadron of Royal Naval Armoured Cars in Armenia and Persia. By his presence of mind he saved the cars when they were ambushed by the Turks at Marnik on 1 September 1916, and by his devotion to duty, courage and hard work he effected the capture of the village of Norschen on 9 September and secured the explosion of a Turkish magazine, with great loss to the enemy. His consistent cheerfulness and unselfishness were a material factor in the success of the work accomplished by the cars.
Gunner (T) James Albert Graham, Royal Navy. In recognition of his services in a submarine, which carried out a successful attack on an enemy Battle Squadron on 5 November 1916.
Captain John Couch, Master of the Transport Trevorian. In recognition of the great coolness, judgment and resource which he displayed under very trying circumstances during the evacuation of Constanța on 22 October 1916. The Trevorian was the last ship to leave the harbour, which was already being shelled, was exposed to shell fire for an hour after putting to sea, and successfully avoided a submarine attack during the voyage. During the whole of this time Captain Couch remained on the bridge.

In recognition of services in the Battle of Jutland
Francis William Potter, Gunner, .  For very important duties during the action, carried out with great coolness and accuracy.
Thomas Bazley, Gunner (T), .  Was of great assistance during action on night of 31 May-1 June. In charge of torpedo armament of ship, and fired at enemy's Battle Fleet during the night with effect.

In recognition of bravery and devotion to duty during mine-sweeping operations
Lieutenant Peter Alexander Crawford Sturrock,  
Lieutenant Arthur Edgar Buckland,  
Temp Lieutenant James Collis Bird,  
Lieutenant William G. Wood, Royal Naval Reserve
Lieutenant Geoffrey Unsworth, Royal Naval Reserve
Lieutenant Rudolph Lancelot Wikner, Royal Naval Reserve
Lieutenant William St. Clair Fleming, Royal Naval Reserve
Lieutenant John Percival Tugwood, Royal Naval Reserve 
Acting Lieutenant William George Duggan, Royal Naval Reserve
Skipper Frederick Alfred Sibley, Royal Naval Reserve
Skipper Benjamin Robert Joyce, Royal Naval Reserve
Skipper George Ferguson, Royal Naval Reserve
Skipper Alexander McLeod, Royal Naval Reserve
Skipper Alexander McKay, Royal Naval Reserve
Skipper Donald McMillan, Royal Naval Reserve
Skipper Samson Herbert Hayes, Royal Naval Reserve

Military Cross (MC)
Lieutenant Ernest Henry Alton, Territorial Force and Officers Training Corps
Temp. 2nd Lieutenant Alphonso Watson Henchy, Royal Dublin Fusiliers 
2nd Lieutenant Harry Aspdin Hewitt, Nottinghamshire & Derbyshire Regiment 
Lieutenant Robert Charles Lyon Holme, Somerset Light Infantry and Royal Flying Corps 
Lieutenant Guy Hardy MacCaw, Hussars 
Captain Michael Cleeve Martyn, Nottinghamshire & Derbyshire Regiment 
Temp. Captain Henry Stewart Powell, Ceylon Rifle and Royal Flying Corps 
Captain Herbert Vernon Stanley, MB, Royal Army Medical Corps 
Temp. 2nd Lieutenant Charles Weir, Royal Irish Rifles 
Temp. 2nd Lieutenant Arthur Lewis Williams, attached Hussars
Captain Reginald Stuart Abbott, Indian Army
Battery Sergeant Major William Henry Abbott, Royal Field Artillery
Temp Lieutenant Robert Lloyd Abell, Royal Field Artillery
Temp Captain Lauchlan Henry Dyke Acland, Royal Engineers
Temp 2nd Lieutenant Robert Parker Adam, Argyll & Sutherland Highlanders, attached Machine Gun Corps
Lieutenant Arthur Joseph John Paul Agius, London Regiment
Temp 2nd Lieutenant Charles Bernard Ainslie, Hussars, attached Machine Gun Squadron
Temp Captain William Ainslie, MD FRVS, Royal Army Medical Corps
2nd Lieutenant James Aitken, Royal Engineers
Temp Captain Sidney James Alexander, Royal Field Artillery
Quartermaster and Honorary Lieutenant John Allan, Seaforth Highlanders
Quartermaster and Honorary Captain James Henry Alldridge, Rifle Brigade
Temp Captain John Stanley Allen, Northumberland Fusiliers
Captain Robert Hall Allen, Royal Artillery
Temp Lieutenant Samuel Allen, Royal Irish Rifles
Captain Harry Surtees Altham, King's Royal Rifle Corps
Temp Captain George Douglas Amery, Hampshire Regiment
Temp Lieutenant Charles Anderson, Royal Scots
Temp Captain Eric John Anderson, Oxfordshire & Buckinghamshire Light Infantry
Captain Martin Alan Anderson, Royal Engineers
Lieutenant Frederick Dudley Andrews, Gloucestershire Regiment
Temp Lieutenant William Paul Andrews, Royal Engineers
2nd Lieutenant John Ajigell, South Lancashire Regiment, attached Machine Gun Corps
Temp Lieutenant Harry Allan Angier, Suffolk Regiment
Lieutenant Edmund Graham Angus, Royal Field Artillery
Temp Captain George Wilfred Anson, North Lancashire Regiment
2nd Lieutenant Geoffrey Arthur Anstee, Bedfordshire Regiment
Captain Ralph Christopher Apletre, Royal Garrison Artillery
2nd Lieutenant John Ernest Appleyard, Royal Engineers
Lieutenant Sidney Charles Manley Archibald, Royal Field Artillery
Captain Robert William Ardagh, Royal Field Artillery
2nd Lieutenant Benjamin Arkle, Liverpool Regiment
2nd Lieutenant Cecil George Arkwright, Northumberland Fusiliers
2nd Lieutenant Tom Elsworth Armistead, West Yorkshire Regiment
Company Sergeant Major John Henry Armitage, Northumberland Fusiliers
Temp Captain George Jackson Armstrong, West Yorkshire Regiment
Temp Captain Walter Launcelot Armstrong, General List
Lieutenant John Sigismund Arthur, Royal Artillery
Company Sergeant Major Frank Edgar Ash, Liverpool Regiment
Temp Captain George F. Ashton, Northumberland Fusiliers
Temp Lieutenant Herbert Courtenay Atkin-Berry, Machine Gun Corps
Captain Surtees Atkinson, Royal Field Artillery
2nd Lieutenant Jehu Fosbrooke Gerrard Aubin, Durham Light Infantry
Captain Robert Starmer Audas, Royal Army Veterinary Corps, employed Egyptian Army
2nd Lieutenant Wentworth Murray Austin, Wiltshire Regiment
Lieutenant Samuel James Manson Auld, Royal Berkshire Regiment
Lieutenant Sir William Eric Thomas Avery, Army Service Corps
Temp 2nd Lieutenant Charles Axten, Royal Field Artillery, attached Trench Mortar Battery
2nd Lieutenant Ernest Robert Crocket Aylett, Northamptonshire Regiment
Temp Lieutenant Walter Edgar Aylwin, Bedfordshire Regiment
Temp Lieutenant Myers Babington, Royal Engineers
2nd Lieutenant Noel Francis Bacon, Royal Artillery, attached Trench Mortar Battery
Captain Richard Romer Claude Baggallay, Irish Guards
Temp Captain Horace Stanley Bagshaw, Manchester Regiment
Rev. Charles Henry Bailey, Royal Army Chaplains' Department
Temp Lieutenant James Oswald Baird, Royal Engineers
2nd Lieutenant Colin Willoughby Baker, Leicestershire Regiment
2nd Lieutenant Eric William Baldwin, Royal Fusiliers
Temp Lieutenant Charles William Robert Ball, Machine Gun Corps
Temp Captain Frank Leslie Ball, East Yorkshire Regiment
Temp Captain Thomas Balston, General List
Captain Cyril d'Albini Sykes Banks, Royal Garrison Artillery
Temp Captain John Cook Banks, King's Royal Rifle Corps
Captain Kenneth Barge, Indian Army
2nd Lieutenant Stanley Randall Barham, Royal Field Artillery
Temp Lieutenant Charles William Tone Barker, Durham Light Infantry
2nd Lieutenant Archie Fairbairn Barnes, Gloucestershire Regiment
Temp 2nd Lieutenant Harry Farquharson Barnes, Royal Field Artillery
Temp Lieutenant The Honourable Ronald Gorell Barnes, Rifle Brigade
Captain William Gordon Barnes, Royal Army Veterinary Corps
Temp Lieutenant Alexander Barnett, Royal Irish Rifles
Temp Lieutenant Reginald Walter Barnett, King's Royal Rifle Corps
Temp Captain George Barnett, late Army Service Corps
Temp Captain Robert McGowan Barrington-Ward, Duke of Cornwall's Light Infantry
Company Sergeant Major Frederick James Barren, Royal Welsh Fusiliers
Temp Captain Sidney Norman Barron, Royal Engineers
Temp Captain Francis Richard Barry, Royal Field Artillery
Captain Richard Augustin Marriott Basset, Royal West Surrey Regiment
Rev. Edward Yeld Bate, Royal Army Chaplains' Department
Lieutenant John Percival Bate, Worcestershire Regiment
Captain Austin Graves Bates, Royal Artillery
Company Sergeant Major Joseph Battilana, Yorkshire Light Infantry
Temp 2nd Lieutenant Charles William Beadle, East Surrey Regiment
Lieutenant Allan Oswald Rufus Beale, Bedfordshire Regiment
Temp Captain Herbert Luis Beardsley, Leicestershire Regiment
2nd Lieutenant Basil Perry Beale, Army Service Corps
Sergeant Major George Dunn Bedson, Royal Highlanders
2nd Lieutenant George Arthur Beggs, London Regiment
Temp Captain Delvine Bell, MB, Royal Army Medical Corps
Lieutenant Eastman Bell, Yeomanry
Temp Captain Francis Gordon Bell, MD , Royal Army Medical Corps
Lieutenant John Joseph James Bell, Royal Field Artillery
Temp Captain Sidney Lara Bell, West Yorkshire Regiment
Lieutenant William Ivor Bell, Royal Engineers
Captain Hugh Maurice Bellamy, Lincolnshire Regiment
Captain Froude Dillon Bellew, Somerset Light Infantry
Lieutenant Philip Reginald Bence-Jones, Royal Engineers
Rev. Arnold John Bennett, Royal Army Chaplains' Department
Temp Lieutenant John Lewis Birkbeck Bentley, Royal Horse Artillery
Lieutenant Percy Bentley, Yorkshire Light Infantry
Captain Francis George Joseph Berkeley, Hampshire Regiment
Temp Lieutenant Oliver Percy Bernard, Royal Engineers
Temp Captain Alexander Tennant Mackintosh Berney-Ficklin, Norfolk Regiment
Temp Captain Edwin Aris Berrisford, Royal Engineers
Temp Lieutenant Owen Charles Bevan, Royal Artillery
Lieutenant Gordon Beveridge, Royal Field Artillery
Temp 2nd Lieutenant Edmund George Bingham, Yorkshire Regiment
Temp Captain Stanley Norman Bingley, Royal Artillery
2nd Lieutenant Arthur Lennox Binns, Lincolnshire Regiment
Temp Lieutenant P. C. Binns, General List, attached Trench Mortar Battery
2nd Lieutenant Leonard Sanderson Birbeck, West Yorkshire Regiment
Lieutenant Henry Theodore Bircham, Durham Light Infantry
Lieutenant William Birrell, East Kent Regiment
Company Sergeant Major Thomas Bishop, Gloucestershire Regiment
Lieutenant George Bissett, 1st Battalion Royal Scots Fusiliers
2nd Lieutenant Cyril Anderson Blackburn, Royal Garrison Artillery
2nd Lieutenant Leonard Arthur Blackett, King's Royal Rifle Corps
Temp Captain Robert Dallas Blackledge, Highland Light Infantry
Captain Gilbert Blaine, Somerset Light Infantry
2nd Lieutenant Thomas Stapleton Blakeley, Royal Lancaster Regiment 
Drill Sergeant Company Sergeant Major Walter Bland, Welsh Guards
Temp Captain John Eastman Blow, Royal Engineers
2nd Lieutenant Charles Eric Boast, Royal Engineers
Lieutenant Frederick Ernest Bodel, Liverpool Regiment, attached Trench Mortar Battery
Lieutenant Thomas Leonard Boden, Middlesex Regiment
Temp 2nd Lieutenant Robert Alexander Bogue, Highland Light Infantry
Lieutenant Richard Bolster, Royal Field Artillery
2nd Lieutenant Eustace Walter Booth, South Staffordshire Regiment
Temp Captain Arthur George Bootle-Wilbraham, Royal Engineers
Temp Lieutenant William Heron Berwick, Royal Field Artillery
Temp Captain John Francis Bourke, Royal Army Medical Corps
2nd Lieutenant Walter James Boutall, London Regiment
Captain Aubrey Percival Bowen, Shropshire Light Infantry
Captain George Eustace Summers Bowen, Royal Field Artillery
Temp Lieutenant Edwin Guthrie Bowers, Northumberland Fusiliers
Captain George Edward Wentworth Bowyer, Oxfordshire & Buckinghamshire Light Infantry
Quartermaster and Honorary Lieutenant Joseph Bowyer, Lancashire Fusiliers
Temp Captain Hedley Boyers, MB, Royal Army Medical Corps
Temp Lieutenant James Boyle, Royal Engineers
Temp Captain Lewis Ceilings-Boyle, Royal Engineers
Temp Lieutenant Alan Geoffrey Brace, Royal Engineers
Temp Lieutenant George Bradstock, Royal Field Artillery
Temp Captain Brian Challoner Brady, Northumberland Fusiliers
Rev. Kevin Richard Brady, Royal Army Chaplains' Department
Temp 2nd Lieutenant Albert Newby Braithwaite, General List, attached Trench Mortar Battery
Captain William Hodgson Braithwaite, West Yorkshire Regiment
Captain Douglas Stephenson Branson, York & Lancaster Regiment
Temp 2nd Lieutenant Dennis James Brass, Lincolnshire Regiment
Captain Eustace Arthur Bray, East Yorkshire Regiment
Lieutenant George Bray, Royal Engineers
Lieutenant Clement Noel Brewin, Royal Garrison Artillery
2nd Lieutenant Edward Ettingdere Bridges, Oxfordshire & Buckinghamshire Light Infantry
2nd Lieutenant Arthur Ernest Brock, Royal Garrison Artillery
Quartermaster and Honorary Lieutenant Samuel Brocklehurst, King's Own Scottish Borderers
Temp Captain Charles Gordon Brodie, Royal Engineers, late Hampshire Regiment
Captain Walter Lorrain Brodie, Highland Light Infantry
Temp Lieutenant John Coventry Bromhall, Machine Gun Corps
Temp Captain Henry James Brooks, Manchester Regiment
Temp 2nd Lieutenant Edward James Brooman, Lancashire Fusiliers
Temp 2nd Lieutenant Ammiel Ezra Brown, Hampshire Regiment
Lieutenant Horace Manton Brown, Suffolk Regiment
Honorary Captain Peter Thomas Brown, Army Ordnance Depot
Lieutenant Robert Arnold Brown, Argyll & Sutherland Highlanders
Temp Lieutenant William Edward Leighton Brown, Cheshire Regiment
Temp Captain George Edward Allenby Browne, Liverpool Regiment
Temp Captain Edgar Lionel Browning, South Staffordshire Regiment
Company Sergeant Major John Brucass, Middlesex Regiment
Rev. Percy Middleton Brumwell, Royal Army Chaplains' Department
2nd Lieutenant Alexander Bryce, Royal Scots Fusiliers, attached Machine Gun Corps
Temp Lieutenant John Humphrys Way Buckell, Royal Engineers
Temp Lieutenant Peter Burton Buckley, Royal Engineers
Captain Francis Henry Budden, Royal Engineers
Temp Captain Geoffrey Armstrong Buddie, Royal Engineers
2nd Lieutenant Eric Tremayne Buller, Duke of Cornwall's Light Infantry
Captain Robert Burgess, Royal Army Medical Corps
Quartermaster and Honorary Major John Burke, Royal Dublin Fusiliers
Temp Lieutenant Harold Burke-Jacklin, Royal Field Artillery, attached Trench Mortar Battery
Temp Captain Richard Parry Burnett, South Staffordshire Regiment
Lieutenant Percival Ernest Burrows, Nottinghamshire & Derbyshire Regiment
Temp Captain George Beatty Burwell, MB, Royal Army Medical Corps
Temp 2nd Lieutenant Eric Lindsay Bury, Royal Engineers
Captain Basil Harding Butler, Royal Field Artillery
Quartermaster and Honorary Lieutenant Ernest George Butler, West Yorkshire Regiment
Captain Richard Brooke Butler-Stoney, Royal Field Artillery
2nd Lieutenant Harry Lewis Butterworth, Royal Engineers
2nd Lieutenant Reginald Harry Cale, Royal West Kent Regiment
Regimental Sergeant Major William Callaghan, Royal Munster Fusiliers
Temp 2nd Lieutenant Percival Alfred Calton, West Yorkshire Regiment
Captain Alan Charles Cameron, York & Lancaster Regiment
2nd Lieutenant Aylmer Lochiel Cameron, Royal Field Artillery
Temp Captain John William Cameron, Special List, attached Trench Mortar Battery
2nd Lieutenant John Brown Corrie Cameron-Mitchell, Royal Engineers
Temp Captain Cyril Cammack, North Lancashire Regiment
Temp Lieutenant Alan Urquhart Campbell, Royal Naval Division attached Trench Mortar Battery
Lieutenant Harold James Campbell, Guards Divisional Ammunition Column, Royal Field Artillery
2nd Lieutenant John Haydon Cardew, Royal Field Artillery
Lieutenant Reginald William Cardew, Royal Engineers
Captain Robert John Henry Carew, Royal Dublin Fusiliers
Captain Cecil Thomas Carfrae, Royal Field Artillery
Captain Frederick Montague Methuen Carlisle, Highland Light Infantry
Lieutenant John Charles Deriton Carlisle, London Regiment
Temp Lieutenant Mathew Carr, Royal Scots Fusiliers
Captain Charles Frederick Carson, Royal Engineers
Captain Francis Samuel Carson, Royal Army Medical Corps
Temp 2nd Lieutenant George Watson Carson, Liverpool Regiment
Temp Lieutenant Joseph Baldwin Carson, Royal Horse Artillery
Lieutenant Percy Carter, Worcestershire Regiment
Temp Captain Samuel Wilfrid Carty, Army Service Corps
Captain Colin Cassidy, MB, Royal Army Medical Corps, employed Egyptian Army
Temp 2nd Lieutenant George Edward Caswell, Northumberland Fusiliers
Temp Captain Malcolm Cathcart, Northamptonshire Regiment
Lieutenant Thomas Francis Cavenagh, Royal Field Artillery
Temp Captain Ronald Newton Caws, Gloucestershire Regiment
Temp 2nd Lieutenant Thomas Edward Chad, Royal Sussex Regiment
Temp Captain Cyril Roy Chambers, South Lancashire Regiment
Temp Lieutenant Ernest John Collis Chapman, General List
Lieutenant Henry Ernest Chapman, Royal Field Artillery
2nd Lieutenant Richard Charnock, Liverpool Regiment
2nd Lieutenant Henry Cheesemond, Northumberland Fusiliers
Captain Ralph Chenevix-Trench, Royal Engineers
Lieutenant Ralph Eric Maxwell Cherry, West Yorkshire Regiment
Captain Robert Graeme Cherry, Royal Field Artillery and Royal Flying Corps
Temp Captain Alexander Bruce Cheves, MB, Royal Army Medical Corps
Captain Joseph Lister Cheyne, Lancers
2nd Lieutenant Hugh Faithful Chittenden, Royal Sussex Regiment
Temp Captain Emelius Charles Chomier, South Wales Borderers
Temp Lieutenant Joseph Roberts Cholerton, Nottinghamshire & Derbyshire Regiment
Temp Lieutenant John Murray Chrystal, Royal Engineers
Company Sergeant Major Alfred Charles Church, Royal Engineers
Temp 2nd Lieutenant James Archibald Church, Royal Engineers
Captain Alfred Joseph Clark, Royal Army Medical Corps
Temp 2nd Lieutenant John William Dixon Clarke, Oxfordshire & Buckinghamshire Light Infantry
Captain Thomas Courtenay Clarke, Royal Army Medical Corps
Sergeant Major William Clarke, Liverpool Regiment
Temp Captain Harold Claxton, Special List
Captain Herbert Henry Spender Clay, Life Guards
Temp 2nd Lieutenant Robert Richard Clay, Dorsetshire Regiment
Temp Lieutenant Thomas Harry Clegg, Manchester Regiment
Lieutenant Eric Charles Clifford, Royal Field Artillery
Temp Captain John Clough, Motor Machine Gun Corps
Temp Lieutenant Herbert Wallis Coales, Royal Engineers
Temp Lieutenant Maurice Lake Cobb, Royal Engineers
Captain Guy Fromanteel Cobbold, York & Lancaster Regiment
2nd Lieutenant Stanley d'Eyncourt Colam, Gordon Highlanders
Temp Captain Guy Cecil Richard Coleridge, South Staffordshire Regiment
Temp Captain Samuel Edward Collier, Essex Regiment
Lieutenant Arthur Francis St. Clair Collins, Army Service Corps
Temp Captain Henry Archer Colt, Gloucestershire Regiment
Temp Lieutenant Edward Walter David Colt-Williams, Army Service Corps
Sergeant Major James William Oscar Columbine, West Riding Regiment
Temp Captain George Henry Comport, Royal Engineers
Temp 2nd Lieutenant Thomas Rathesay Conning, Royal Welsh Fusiliers
Lieutenant Herbert Norman Constantino, Yorkshire Regiment
Captain Joseph Gabbett Maunsell Butterworth Cooke, Royal Garrison Artillery
2nd Lieutenant Wilfrid Edward Cooke, Royal Field Artillery
2nd Lieutenant John Cecil Coombes, Oxfordshire & Buckinghamshire Light Infantry, attached Trench Mortar Battery
Temp 2nd Lieutenant Edward Priestley Cooper, East Yorkshire Regiment
Temp 2nd Lieutenant Sydney George Cordwell, Leicestershire Regiment
2nd Lieutenant Charles Edward Correll, Yorkshire Regiment
2nd Lieutenant John Charles Corsan, Royal Field Artillery
Sub Conductor Frederick Richard Costigan, Army Ordnance Corps
Temp Captain John Sewell Courtauld, General List
Rev. John Dey Coutts, Royal Army Chaplains' Department
Captain William McCrea Cleeve Cowan, Royal Field Artillery
Captain Arthur Basil Cowburn, Border Regiment
Temp Lieutenant Noel Bruce St. John Cowie, Royal Field Artillery
Temp Captain Richard John Cowser, Army Service Corps
2nd Lieutenant Cyril Ernest Cox, Middlesex Regiment
Temp Captain James Wolseley Cox, East Lancashire Regiment
Captain Ralph George Snead Cox, Royal Inniskilling Fusiliers, attached Machine Gun Corps
Captain Archibald Craig, Argyll & Sutherland Highlanders
Temp Captain George Washington Cooper Craik, General List, attached Trench Mortar Battery
Captain Hugh Gregan Crawford, Royal Army Medical Corps
Lieutenant Cedric Basil Hartley Crawshaw, Royal Engineers
Lieutenant Duncan Vandeleur Creagh, Hussars
Temp Captain Andrew Gavin Maitland Makgill Crichton, Cameron Highlanders
Captain George Keeble Crichton, Lowland Divisional Train, Army Service Corps
Temp Captain Richard Howe Crichton, Royal Munster Fusiliers
Temp Captain Percy Greville Howard Cripps, Duke of Cornwall's Light Infantry
Lieutenant Norman Richard Crockatt, Royal Scots
Temp Captain Douglas Edward Crosbie, Royal Army Medical Corps
Company Sergeant Major Charles Cross, Machine Gun Corps, formerly Norfolk Regiment
Captain William Henry Francis Crowe, Royal Field Artillery
Temp Lieutenant Maxwell William Frederic Cullinan, King's Royal Rifle Corps
Captain Arthur Gordon Cummins, MB, Royal Army Medical Corps, employed Egyptian Army
2nd Lieutenant Cecil Cundall, Royal Inniskilling Fusiliers
Company Sergeant Major Thomas Cunningham, Cameron Highlanders
Captain William Sidney Noel Curie, Royal Field Artillery
Captain Archibald Douglas Currie, Royal Field Artillery
2nd Lieutenant John Dorrien Constable Curtis, Royal Lancaster Regiment
Temp Captain Philip Pinckney Curtis, Hussars
2nd Lieutenant Raymond Howarth Cutting, Devonshire Regiment, commanding Machine Gun Company
Temp Lieutenant Cedric Hunton Daggett, Northumberland Fusiliers
Temp Lieutenant Thomas Daish, Royal Engineers
Temp Lieutenant Paul Dalton, Rifle Brigade
2nd Lieutenant William Daly, East Lancashire Regiment
Temp Lieutenant Cyril Danby, General List and Royal Flying Corps
Temp Captain Clive Collingwood Dangar, Special List (late Hussars)
Temp Major Thomas Edward St. Clare Danniell, General List and Royal Flying Corps
Captain Cecil Francis Davey, Reserve
Temp Captain William Edgsworth David, MB, Royal Army Medical Corps
Captain Duncan Davidson, MB, Royal Army Medical Corps
Captain Edward Humphrey Davidson, Gordon Highlanders
Temp Lieutenant Evan Davies, Welsh Regiment
Company Sergeant Major Henry Lewis Davies, Middlesex Regiment
Captain Otto Hanbury Davies, Royal Garrison Artillery
Temp Lieutenant Thomas Henry Davies, Royal Engineers
Temp Captain John Ogilvie Davis, Royal Flying Corps, Special Reserve
Company Sergeant Major Henry Davison, Scots Guards, attached Gordon Highlanders
Captain Hugh Frank Dawes, Royal Fusiliers
Captain Alfred Dawson, Royal Field Artillery
2nd Lieutenant Frank Dawson, Northumberland Fusiliers
Temp Captain James Maclaren Dawson, Royal Army Veterinary Corps
Temp Lieutenant Mark Scott Duncan Day, Royal Engineers
Temp 2nd Lieutenant Shirley Cuthbert Day, Nottinghamshire & Derbyshire Regiment
Temp Lieutenant Lancelot Colin William Deane, South Wales Borderers
Lieutenant George Dudley DeAth, Royal Engineers
Captain Murray Heathfield Dendy, Royal Artillery
Captain Guy de Hoghton, Yorkshire Light Infantry, attached Machine Gun Corps
Temp Captain Kenneth de Jong, Royal Sussex Regiment
2nd Lieutenant John Joseph Dempsey, Scottish Rifles
Temp Captain Harold Henry de Laessoe, General List
Captain Humphrey Edmund de Trafford, Coldstream Guards
Temp 2nd Lieutenant Colin Deuchar, Northumberland Fusiliers
Temp 2nd Lieutenant Richard Harding Frank Devereaux, Rifle Brigade
Staff Sergeant Major Ernest Dickinson, Army Service Corps
Lieutenant William Everard Dickson, Lancashire Fusiliers, attached Machine Gun Company
Captain John March Diggles, Cheshire Regiment
Temp Lieutenant Thomas Brabazon Disney, Royal Engineers
Quartermaster and Honorary Lieutenant John Disselduff, Argyll & Sutherland Highlanders
Lieutenant Joseph Gilbert Dixon, Worcestershire Regiment
Temp Lieutenant Reginald Malyn Dixon, Royal Engineers
Temp 2nd Lieutenant Vernon Gilbert Dixon, King's Royal Rifle Corps
Temp Lieutenant Alfred Percival Dobson, Royal Berkshire Regiment, attached Machine Gun Company
2nd Lieutenant Philip Henley Dodgson, Royal Field Artillery
Temp 2nd Lieutenant George William Arthur Doe, Devonshire Regiment
Temp Lieutenant Henry Eric Dolan, Headquarters, Royal Field Artillery
Captain Daniel Dougal, Royal Army Medical Corps
Temp Lieutenant Charles Stuart Douglas, Nottinghamshire & Derbyshire Regiment
Rev. William Joseph Doyle, Royal Army Chaplains' Department
Captain John Hughes Drake, Yeomanry
Temp 2nd Lieutenant Leonard Apthorpe Draper, Royal Fusiliers, attached Machine Gun Company
Temp Lieutenant William Basil Yeatman Draper, Royal Engineers
Company Sergeant Major John Drayson, Northumberland Fusiliers
Lieutenant Evelyn Hugh James Duberly, Grenadier Guards
Temp 2nd Lieutenant James Edward Duffield, Leinster Regiment
Temp 2nd Lieutenant Cecil Duffitt, Royal Engineers
Temp Captain Robert Norman Duke, Royal Highlanders
Captain Thomas Ingram Dun, MB, Royal Army Medical Corps
Lieutenant Alan Gomme Duncan, London Regiment
Temp Captain George Wilson Duncan, Seaforth Highlanders
Captain Charles Stuart Dunkley, Welsh Regiment
Lieutenant John Kinninmont Dunlop, London Regiment, attached Machine Gun Company
Temp Captain John Leeper Dunlop, MB, Royal Army Medical Corps
Lieutenant Raymond Frederick Dunnett, Worcestershire Regiment
Battery Quartermaster Sergeant William Dunsmore, Highland Light Infantry
Captain James Alfred Durie, Royal Highlanders
Captain Thomas Edwin Durie, Royal Field Artillery
Temp Lieutenant Kingsley Dykes, Royal West Kent Regiment
2nd Lieutenant William Easten, Northumberland Fusiliers
Captain Hugh William Viscount Ebrington, Dragoons
Captain Henry Charles Hamilton Eden, Royal Field Artillery
Temp Captain Beresford Harry Huey Edkins, Army Service Corps, attached Machine Gun Corps
Captain Charles Derwent Edwards, MD, Royal Army Medical Corps
2nd Lieutenant Edward Edwards, Lincolnshire Regiment
Captain Guy Janion Edwards, Coldstream Guards
Captain Harold Walter Edwards, Royal Warwickshire Regiment
John Henry Edwards, Middlesex Regiment
Temp 2nd Lieutenant Franklin George Ekins, Royal Irish Regiment
Temp Captain Sacheverelle Pole Eldrid, Wiltshire Regiment
Temp 2nd Lieutenant Valentine Byron Curzon de Pole Eldrid, General List, attached Trench Mortar Battery
Quartermaster and Honorary Major Alfred Ellam, West Riding Regiment
Temp Lieutenant George Fothergill Ellenberger, Yorkshire Light Infantry
Honorary Captain Henry Frederick Elliott, Army Ordnance Depot
Lieutenant John Gray Ellis, London Regiment
Captain Richard Stanley Ellis, Royal Field Artillery
Captain Arthur Addison Ellwood, Lincolnshire Regiment, attached Machine Gun Company
Temp Captain Wilfrid Elstob, Manchester Regiment
Temp 2nd Lieutenant Arthur Alexander English, Royal Engineers
Temp Lieutenant William Richard English-Murphy, South Staffordshire Regiment
Temp Captain Lionel Ensor, Suffolk Regiment
Temp Lieutenant James Epps, Royal Engineers
Temp Captain Evan Evans, Royal Army Medical Corps
Captain Sydney Gerald Evans, Royal Sussex Regiment
Battery Quartermaster Sergeant Thomas Evans, Royal Scots
Company Sergeant Major Walter Evans, Worcestershire Regiment
Temp 2nd Lieutenant George Thomas Eve, Royal Engineers
Temp Quartermaster and Honorary Lieutenant Frederick George Evenden, Royal Army Medical Corps
Temp 2nd Lieutenant Horace John Everett, Bedfordshire Regiment
Temp Lieutenant Arthur Potter Evershed, Royal Field Artillery
Temp Lieutenant George Fairbairn, Royal Engineers
Temp Captain Donald Farquharson, General List
Temp Lieutenant Sydney Farr, Royal Field Artillery
Captain James Edward Fasken, Army Service Corps
Temp Captain John Champion Faunthorpe, General List
Temp Captain Walter Fawcus, Northumberland Fusiliers
Lieutenant Reginald William Lyon Fellowes, Royal Field Artillery
Temp Major Sidney Fenner, Royal Berkshire Regiment
Lieutenant George Ferguson, Royal Field Artillery
Captain Philip Hew Ferguson, Royal Field Artillery
2nd Lieutenant Edward Hubert Field, Royal Field Artillery
Temp Lieutenant Arthur Percival Figgins, Welsh Regiment
Temp 2nd Lieutenant Ernest Victor Finch, Lancashire Fusiliers
Temp Captain Vernon Shaw Taylor Fincken, General List, attached Yorkshire Light Infantry
Captain Charles Bannatyne Findlay, Royal Artillery
Temp Lieutenant William Eric Fisher, Army Service Corps
Temp Captain James Gerald Edward FitzGerald, Machine Gun Corps
Temp Lieutenant Maurice Harrington FitzGerald, Royal Munster Fusiliers
2nd Lieutenant John Aloysius FitzHerbert, Royal Garrison Artillery
Captain Ernest Gale Fleming, Royal Field Artillery
Captain Thomas Gordon Fleming, MB, Royal Army Medical Corps
Quartermaster, Honorary Lieutenant and Temp Major Albert Fletcher, Royal Flying Corps
Temp 2nd Lieutenant Louis Edward Flint, Nottinghamshire & Derbyshire Regiment
Temp Captain Francis Flood-Page, Royal Engineers
Temp Captain Robert William Foot, Royal Artillery
Captain John Lachlan Forbes, Royal Garrison Artillery
Captain James Forbes-Robertson, Border Regiment
Temp Captain Careleton Yates Ford, MD, Royal Army Medical Corps
Company Sergeant Major Henry Charles Ford, Royal Welsh Fusiliers
Temp 2nd Lieutenant Hubert Forrest, Royal Garrison Artillery, attached Trench Mortar Battery
2nd Lieutenant John Campbell Forsyth, Royal Highlanders
Lieutenant Frederick William Foster, Royal Warwickshire Regiment
Lieutenant Neville John Acland Foster, Royal Field Artillery
Temp Captain Alfred Fox, Royal Field Artillery
Captain Marmaduke Sextus Fox, Highland Light Infantry
Temp 2nd Lieutenant Ralph Henry Shoolbred Fox, Royal Engineers
Temp Captain Cecil James Francis, Northumberland Fusiliers
Temp Lieutenant Douglas James Fraser, Royal Field Artillery
Temp Captain Donald Thomas Fraser, MB, Royal Army Medical Corps
Lieutenant Francis Hugh Fraser, West Riding Regiment
Captain John Fraser, MB, Royal Army Medical Corps
Quartermaster and Honorary Lieutenant Charles Henry Frazier, Manchester Regiment
Lieutenant Walter Hanson Freeman, West Yorkshire Regiment
Quartermaster and Honorary Captain Sidney Freestone, Essex Regiment
Lieutenant Lancelot Gerhard Freeth, Royal Engineers
Company Sergeant Major Samuel Stephen Froud, Army Service Corps
Temp Captain Archibald Fullerton, MB, Royal Army Medical Corps
Temp Captain William Stanley Furness, Royal Inniskilling Fusiliers
Captain Harry Read Gadd, Suffolk Regiment
Captain Henry Davis Gale, Royal Field Artillery
Temp Captain Harold Rosonlew Gallatly, General List
Captain William Rickards Galwey, MB, Royal Army Medical Corps
2nd Lieutenant Leslie Carr Gamage, London Regiment 
Sergeant Major Robert Gamble, Irish Guards
2nd Lieutenant Henry Stobart Gammell, Gordon Highlanders
Temp Captain Charles Arthur Garden, Special Reserve Battalion, Royal Engineers
Temp Captain David Gardiner, King's Royal Rifle Corps
Temp Captain Alfred Thomas Goldie Gardner, Royal Field Artillery
Temp Lieutenant Kenneth Gordon Garnett, Royal Field Artillery
Captain Alan Parry Garnier, Northumberland Fusiliers
Lieutenant Lawrence Francis Garratt, Royal Garrison Artillery
Temp 2nd Lieutenant Henry Burton-Guest Garrett, General List, attached Trench Mortar Battery
Captain Richard Vesey Mackay Garry, Royal Garrison Artillery
Lieutenant Clair James Gasson, South Lancashire Regiment
2nd Lieutenant Gordon Smith Mellis Gauld, Royal Field Artillery
Temp Captain Alastair Cosmo Burton Geddes, General List and Royal Flying Corps
Lieutenant Horace James Gee, Royal Garrison Artillery
Lieutenant William Charles Coleman Gell, Royal Warwickshire Regiment
Captain Gerard Edward James Gent, Duke of Cornwall's Light Infantry
Temp Captain Paul Gibb, Army Service Corps
Temp Lieutenant Thomas Telford Gibb, Royal Engineers
Captain Alfred Joseph Gibbs, Royal Artillery
Captain Lancelot Merivale Gibbs, Coldstream Guards
2nd Lieutenant Newton Gott Gibson, Royal Scots Fusiliers
Temp Lieutenant Charles Gilchrist, Royal Engineers
Lieutenant Humfrey Livingston Gilks, London Regiment
Captain John Galbraith Gill, MB, Royal Army Medical Corps
Captain Napier John Gill, Royal Artillery and Royal Flying Corps
Temp Lieutenant Allyne Farmer Gimson, Royal Field Artillery
Temp 2nd Lieutenant Walter Stanley Gimson, Yorkshire Light Infantry, commanding Trench Mortar Battery
Temp Lieutenant Robert John Gittins, Machine Gun Company
Captain Guy de Courcy Glover, South Staffordshire Regiment
Rev. Edward O'Sullivan Goidanich, Royal Army Chaplains' Department
Temp 2nd Lieutenant Cyril Harry Golding, Welsh Regiment
Captain Arthur Vincent Gompertz, Royal Engineers
Captain Guy Vernon Goodliffe, Royal Fusiliers
Lieutenant Alan Francis Lindsay-Gordon, Irish Guards
Temp Lieutenant Bradford Leslie Gordon, Yorkshire Light Infantry
Temp Captain William Hay Gosse, Royal Field Artillery
Acting Regimental Sergeant Major Herbert Goulding, Lancashire Fusiliers
Temp Captain Geoffry Balfour Gourlay, Gordon Highlanders
Lieutenant Donald James Grant, Argyll & Sutherland Highlanders
Temp Lieutenant William Grant, Royal Engineers
Sergeant Major William Gray, Liverpool Regiment
Quartermaster and Honorary Captain John Henry Greaseley, Leicestershire Regiment
Temp Lieutenant Albert Green, Royal Engineers
Temp 2nd Lieutenant Edwin Unsworth-Green, North Lancashire Regiment
Temp 2nd Lieutenant Gilbert Ware M. Green, Royal Flying Corps
Captain Ranolf Nelson Greenwood, Cheshire Regiment
Lieutenant Guy Cochrane Veall Greetham, Somerset Light Infantry
Captain Arthur Leslie Gregory, Dorsetshire Regiment
Captain Mancha Gregory, Royal Field Artillery
Temp Captain Robert Blyth Greig, General List
Temp Captain James Ross Grieve, Royal Field Artillery
Rev. Hubert Vavasor Griffiths, Royal Army Chaplains' Department
Lieutenant Edward William Macleay Grigg, Grenadier Guards
Captain Stanley Thomas Grigg, West Yorkshire Regiment, attended Camel Corps, Egyptian Army
Temp 2nd Lieutenant Hugh Noel Grimwade, Durham Light Infantry
2nd Lieutenant Herbert Frederick Grizelle, London Regiment
Captain Richard Raymond de Cruce Grubb, Hussars and Royal Flying Corps
Captain John Gurdon, East Surrey Regiment
Temp Lieutenant Reginald Duncan Gwyther, Royal Engineers 
Captain Edward Sidney Hacker, Army Service Corps
Temp Captain David Hamilton Hadden, MB
Battery Quartermaster Sergeant Samuel Hague, Gloucestershire Regiment
Lieutenant Richard Haigh, Royal Berkshire Regiment
Captain George Harris Haines, Royal Army Medical Corps
Temp Sub-Lieutenant William Charles Haken,  
Divn Captain Harry Alexander Lewis Hall, Royal Engineers
Lieutenant Henry Ronald Hall, Royal Field Artillery
Quartermaster and Honorary Lieutenant James Henry Hall, Gordon Highlanders
Captain Philip Ashley Hall, Oxfordshire & Buckinghamshire Light Infantry
Lieutenant Roger Hall, Royal Fusiliers
2nd Lieutenant James Hugh Halle, Devonshire Regiment
Temp Captain Robert Morton Hamilton, General List
Temp Captain Harold Parrish Hamilton, MB, Royal Army Medical Corps
Lieutenant Hugh Bowenscombe Hammond, Royal Field Artillery, attached Trench Mortar Battery
Captain Lionel Berkeley Harbord, Indian Army
Temp Captain George Francis Hardy, Royal Army Medical Corps
Lieutenant John Herbert Hardy, Royal Lancaster Regiment
Temp Captain Lancelot Geldert Hare, Yorkshire Regiment
Captain William Theodore Hare, Royal Army Medical Corps
Temp Lieutenant Royland Ray Harkus, King's Own Scottish Borderers
Lieutenant Arthur Leslie Harman, Royal Field Artillery
Temp Captain Raymond Edwards Harman, Royal Garrison Artillery
Company Sergeant Major Robert Henry Harper, Gloucestershire Regiment
Temp Quartermaster and Honorary Lieutenant George Henry Harris, Nottinghamshire & Derbyshire Regiment
2nd Lieutenant George Herbert Harrison, North Lancashire Regiment
Lieutenant Cecil Pryce Harrison, Royal Horse Artillery
Temp Captain George Arthur Harrison, Royal Engineers
Sergeant Major Joseph Harrison, South Lancashire Regiment
Captain William Clavering Hartgill, Royal Army Medical Corps
2nd Lieutenant Leslie George Hartmann, Royal Field Artillery
Temp 2nd Lieutenant Thomas Daniel Harvey, attached Machine Gun Company
Lieutenant John Francis Haseldine, Royal Engineers
Sergeant Major Frederick Hatt, Royal Dublin Fusiliers
Captain Leonard Arthur Hawes, Royal Artillery
Temp Lieutenant Richard Maurice Hawkins, Royal Fusiliers
Lieutenant Stanley Hawkins, Honourable Artillery Company
Lieutenant Douglas Hay, Royal Field Artillery
Captain Audrey Thomas Husey Hayes, Royal Field Artillery
Temp 2nd Lieutenant Charles Wyndham Hayes, Royal Engineers
Quartermaster and Honorary Lieutenant Arthur Hazlegrove, South Staffordshire Regiment
Captain Norman Canning Healing, Royal Garrison Artillery
Temp 2nd Lieutenant Christopher Francis Healy, Royal Dublin Fusiliers
2nd Lieutenant Frederick William Heath, London Regiment
Lieutenant Frederick Allan Hellaby, Machine Gun Corps
Captain Charles Edward Piercy Henderson, Royal Field Artillery
Temp Captain Gilbert Heron, Royal Field Artillery
Captain Charles Montague Hewlett, South Lancashire Regiment
Temp Captain Morris Sadler Heycock, Rifle Brigade
2nd Lieutenant Cuthbert Ambrose Anthony Hiatt, Norfolk Regiment and Royal Flying Corps
Temp Captain John Geoffrey Hibbert, Army Ordnance Depot
2nd Lieutenant Eric Raymond Hicks, Royal Field Artillery, attached Medium Trench Mortar Battery
2nd Lieutenant William Edward Hicks, Royal Garrison Artillery
Quartermaster and Honorary Lieutenant Hugh Hidden, Life Guards
2nd Lieutenant Daniel Higgins, London Regiment
Lieutenant John Esmond Longuet Higgins, London Regiment
Temp Lieutenant Henry Hilditch, Machine Gun Corps
2nd Lieutenant Arthur Frederick Creery Hill, Surrey Yeomanry
Captain Charles Frederick Hill, Suffolk Regiment
Temp Captain Horace Frederick Hill, Middlesex Regiment
Lieutenant Ernest Ebenezer Hine, East Lancashire Regiment
Temp 2nd Lieutenant Joseph Hirst, East Yorkshire Regiment, attached Trench Mortar Battery
Temp Captain Albert Goring Hoade, General List
Captain Godfrey Cecil Sanford Hodgson, Yeomanry
Sergeant Major James Hodson, Manchester Regiment
Temp Lieutenant Arthur Rupert Pieschell-Hoffmann, Army Service Corps
Lieutenant John William Hoggart, Royal Field Artillery
Lieutenant William Corson Holden, Royal Garrison Artillery
Captain Allen Holford-Walker, Argyll & Sutherland Highlanders, attached Machine Gun Corps
Temp Captain Frank Holl, Army Service Corps
Lieutenant Harold Ernest Holland, London Regiment
Temp Lieutenant Jasper Cyril Holmes, Royal Engineers
Temp Lieutenant John Seaman Holmes, Royal Engineers
Sergeant Major William Thomas Holmes, King's Royal Rifle Corps
Temp Lieutenant George Herbert Hopkins, Liverpool Regiment
2nd Lieutenant Gerard Walter Sturges Hopkins, Royal Warwickshire Regiment, attached Trench Mortar Battery
Captain Rawdon Scott Hopkins, East Yorkshire Regiment
Temp Captain Edwin James Hornby, Royal Engineers
Lieutenant Charles Edward Homer, Royal Garrison Artillery
Temp Captain Wilfred Palmer Horsley, General List, attached Trench Mortar Battery
2nd Lieutenant Gilbert Burdett Howcroft, West Riding Regiment
2nd Lieutenant Allen Crawford Howard, Royal Engineers
Temp Lieutenant Edward Howell, North Lancashire Regiment
Captain Sidney Howes, Lancers
Company Sergeant Major Albert Howes, London Regiment
2nd Lieutenant Charles Frederick Hoyle, Yeomanry
Temp Captain Walter Musgrave Hoyle, Royal Lancaster Regiment
Lieutenant Frank Hudson, Royal Flying Corps
Temp Lieutenant Henry Moore Hudspeth, Royal Engineers
Temp Captain Christopher Wyndham Hughes, Wiltshire Regiment
Lieutenant Frederick Llewellyn Hughes, Liverpool Regiment
Temp Major Joshua Bower Hughes-Games, Durham Light Infantry
Captain Francis Hugh Huleatt, Royal Field Artillery
Temp Lieutenant Frederick Charles Humphreys, Somerset Light Infantry
Company Sergeant Major George Robert Humphriss, Royal Warwickshire Regiment
Captain Edgar David Cope Hunt, Suffolk Regiment
Temp Lieutenant Brian Hussey, Royal Engineers
Lieutenant George Thomas Hutchinson, Oxfordshire Hussars Yeomanry
Lieutenant Henry Youle Huthwaite, Royal Lancaster Regiment
2nd Lieutenant Henry Cyril Harker Illingworth, Royal Berkshire Regiment
Captain Henry Bouhier Imbert-Terry, Royal Field Artillery
Captain Robert Lance Impey, MB, Royal Army Medical Corps
2nd Lieutenant William Ernest Ind, London Regiment
Lieutenant Gordon Stewart Inglis, Royal Engineers
Lieutenant John Drummond Inglis, Royal Engineers
Captain Alexander Innes, Royal Highlanders
Lieutenant Raymond Percy Gilbert Ireland, King's Royal Rifle Corps
Temp Captain Richard Bryan Ireland, Royal Engineers
Quartermaster and Honorary Lieutenant John Foster Ives, Royal Army Veterinary Corps
Temp Lieutenant John Jack, Royal Welsh Fusiliers
Temp Lieutenant John William Jack, Royal Engineers
Temp Captain Andrew Francis Butler Jackson, Army Service Corps
Lieutenant Alexander Maclean Jackson, Royal Engineers
2nd Lieutenant Ernest Jackson, Royal Engineers
2nd Lieutenant Harold Alfred Jackson, Essex Regiment
Captain Henry Hall Jackson, Hussars
Temp 2nd Lieutenant Harry Yule Vivian Jackson, Royal Engineers
Captain Mansel Halket Jackson, Indian Army
Captain Richard Dingwall Jackson, Royal Engineers
Temp Captain Theophilus Rudolph Jackson, General List
Acting Regimental Sergeant Major Charles Frederick Jagger, East Yorkshire Regiment
Temp Captain Albert John Stanley James, Royal Welsh Fusiliers
Temp Lieutenant Francis Raymund James, Royal Field Artillery
Captain Cecil Jarvis, 20th Deccan Horse, Indian Army
Temp Captain Arthur Alfred Jayne, Royal Engineers
Temp 2nd Lieutenant Stanley Gordon Jeeves, Royal Engineers
Captain Wilfred John Jervois, Northamptonshire Regiment
Lieutenant Samuel Beckett Johns, South Wales Borderers
Lieutenant Cyril George Johnson, Northumberland Fusiliers
Temp Captain Herbert Hammond Johnson, Welsh Regiment
Honorary Captain Robert Charles Johnson, Army Ordnance Depot
Captain George Gordon Johnstone, MB, Royal Army Medical Corps
Temp Lieutenant Austin Ellis Lloyd Jones, Headquarters, Royal Artillery
Captain Cedric La Touche Turner Jones, Royal Engineers
2nd Lieutenant Eric Greville Jones, Durham Light Infantry
Captain Frank Bernard Jones, Oxfordshire & Buckinghamshire Light Infantry
Lieutenant James Jones, Durham Light Infantry
Temp 2nd Lieutenant Llewellyn Wynne Jones, Royal Welsh Fusiliers
Captain Owen Glyndwr Digby Jones, Royal Engineers
2nd Lieutenant Owen John Jones, Royal Field Artillery
Rev. Sidney Jenkins Jones, Royal Army Chaplains' Department
Battery Quartermaster Sergeant Daniel David Jones, Coldstream Guards
2nd Lieutenant Sydney Stevenson Jones, South Lancashire Regiment
2nd Lieutenant Peter Crichton Kay, Middlesex Regiment
Temp Captain Raymond Conrad Murray Keefe, Manchester Regiment
Temp. Captain Bertram Francis Eardley Keeling, Royal Engineers
2nd Lieutenant Augustine Henry Keenan, Royal Highlanders
Temp Captain David Barrogill Keith, Scottish Rifles
Captain Thomas James Kelly, MB, Royal Army Medical Corps
2nd Lieutenant Alexander Kemp, Royal Engineers
Captain Geoffrey Chicheley Kemp, B Battery, Royal Field Artillery
Lieutenant James Crichton Kemp, Royal Scots
2nd Lieutenant Joseph Kendall, Lincolnshire Regiment
Temp Captain Keith Kennard, Army Service Corps
Captain Charles Courtenay Marshall Kennedy, Hertfordshire Regiment, attached Anzac Corps
Lieutenant Albert Edmund Kent, Leicestershire Regiment
2nd Lieutenant Harold Anthony Kenyon, Royal Engineers
Temp Lieutenant Robert White Keown, East Kent Regiment
Sergeant Major Charles Henry Kernot, Royal Flying Corps
Captain John David Kerr, Nottinghamshire & Derbyshire Regiment
Lieutenant Loraine Macgregor Kerr, West Yorkshire Regiment
Company Sergeant Major Peter Kerr, Royal Scots
Temp Captain Robert Goodman Kerr, Royal Inniskilling Fusiliers
Company Sergeant Major Arthur Kidd, Cameron Highlanders
Lieutenant Edward Charles Randolph Kilkelly, Royal Field Artillery
Temp Lieutenant James Benjamin Kindersley, Royal Field Artillery
Temp Captain Edward Herbert King, Special List, attached Intelligence Corps
Company Sergeant Major Harry King, Royal West Surrey Regiment
Temp Captain Maurice Baylis King, MB, Royal Army Medical Corps
Temp Captain William James King, Rifle Brigade
Captain Algernon Robert Fitzhardinge Kingscote, Royal Garrison Artillery
Lieutenant Reginald George Kinsey, Highland Light Infantry, attached Machine Gun Company
Temp 2nd Lieutenant Leslie Holbrook Kitton, General List, attached Trench Mortar Battery
Lieutenant John Kyle, East Yorkshire Regiment, commanding Trench Mortar Battery
Temp 2nd Lieutenant William George Lacey, Army Service Corps
Temp Captain Charles John C. La Coste, General List
Temp Lieutenant John Head Laidman, Royal Artillery, attached Trench Mortar Battery
2nd Lieutenant William Frederick Laing, Durham Light Infantry
Captain Alexander Fane Lambert, Royal Artillery
Temp Captain Guy Fitzroy Lambert, East Yorkshire Regiment
Captain Ronald Streeter Lambert, Grenadier Guards
Lieutenant John Robertson Lamberton, Highland Light Infantry
Temp 1st Class Staff Sergeant Major Joseph George Lane, Army Service Corps
Rev. John Lane-Fox, Royal Army Chaplains' Department
Lieutenant Norman Cyril Lang, Royal Garrison Artillery
Temp Captain Ernest Theodore Lavarack, Suffolk Regiment
2nd Lieutenant Charles Edward William Lavender, Gloucestershire Regiment
Temp Captain John Herbert George Lawrance, Royal Berkshire Regiment
Sergeant Major William George Lawrance, Rifle Brigade
Lieutenant Maurice Edward Seymour Laws, Royal Garrison Artillery
Captain Ernest Ivory Lea, Royal Warwickshire Regiment
Captain Robin Seely Leach, Royal Field Artillery
2nd Lieutenant William Kenneth Muntz Leader, Duke of Cornwall's Light Infantry
Temp Captain Claude Lancelot Leake, General List
Temp Lieutenant George Ledgard, Royal Engineers
Company Sergeant Major Frederick Charles Leavens, Royal Sussex Regiment
Temp Lieutenant Audley Andrew Dowell Lee, Leicestershire Regiment
Lieutenant Kenneth James Lee, Royal Engineers
2nd Lieutenant Leslie Gordon Lee, Yorkshire Regiment, attached Trench Mortar Battery
Temp Captain Francis Thomas Lee-Norman, Royal Engineers
Captain Frank Bertram Legh, Royal Engineers
Captain Hubert le Jeune, Royal Flying Corps
Captain Gerald Quin Lannane, Royal Army Medical Corps
Temp Lieutenant Hugh William Lester, West Riding Regiment
Temp 2nd Lieutenant Jack Levy, Royal Fusiliers
Temp Captain Dudley Lewis, York & Lancaster Regiment
Temp Captain Malcolm Meredith Lewis, Royal Welsh Fusiliers
Temp Captain Walter Lewis, Gloucestershire Regiment
2nd Lieutenant William Maximilian Lindley, Royal Engineers
2nd Lieutenant Robert Strathern Lindsay, Royal Scots
Lieutenant John Lindsell, North Lancashire Regiment
Captain Hubert Frederick Ling, Suffolk Regiment
Captain Robert Walton Ling, Royal Field Artillery
2nd Lieutenant Arthur Carr Ashton Litchfield, Royal Field Artillery
Captain James Lithgow, Royal Garrison Artillery
Temp 2nd Lieutenant Clarence Robert Little, General List, attached Trench Mortar Battery
Temp Lieutenant James William Littlejohn, MD, Royal Army Medical Corps
Captain John Conway Lloyd, South Wales Borderers
Captain John Daniel Stuart Lloyd, Welsh Horse
Temp Captain Philip Lloyd-Graeme, King's Royal Rifle Corps
Battery Sergeant Major Charles Locke, Royal Field Artillery
2nd Lieutenant Leslie Keith Lockhart, Royal Field Artillery
Temp Captain Ambrose Lome Lockwood, MD, Royal Army Medical Corps
Temp Captain Malcolm Hunter Logan, Royal Engineers
Captain Cyril Ernest Napier Lomax, Welsh Regiment
2nd Lieutenant Reginald Frederick Long, Royal Field Artillery
Temp Captain Ralph Longstaff, East Yorkshire Regiment
Captain Reginald Percy Lord, Hampshire Regiment
2nd Lieutenant John Scott Lorimer, Norfolk Regiment, commanding Trench Mortar Battery
Temp Captain Harry Chickall Lott, Royal Sussex Regiment
Temp Quartermaster and Honorary Lieutenant John Lovelock, Shropshire Light Infantry
Lieutenant Alban Low, Royal Irish Fusiliers, attached Machine Gun Company
Temp Captain William Douglas Lowe, Durham Light Infantry
2nd Lieutenant Herbert Lowther, Royal Field Artillery
Temp Lieutenant Cecil John George Luck, Seaforth Highlanders
Captain David Lumsden, Royal Highlanders
Captain William Vernon Lumsden, Argyll & Sutherland Highlanders, attached Machine Gun Company
Temp Major Norman Lunn, Northumberland Fusiliers
Captain William Ernest Craven Lunn, MB, Royal Army Medical Corps
2nd Lieutenant Hugh Ralph Lupton, West Yorkshire Regiment
Captain Lionel Gallwey Lutyens, Royal Field Artillery
Surgeon-Captain Evelyn John Hansler Luxmoore, Life Guards
Captain William Lyall, Gordon Highlanders
Temp Lieutenant Norman Yates Lyle, Royal Scots Fusiliers
Temp Captain Sydney James Lyle, Royal Irish Rifles
Lieutenant Cecil Eric Lewis Lyne, Royal Field Artillery
Captain Harold Syme Macdonald, Royal Field Artillery
Temp Lieutenant William Murray Macdonald, Royal Engineers
Temp Lieutenant John MacFarlane, Royal Fusiliers
Lieutenant Peter Donald MacFeat, Royal Engineers
Temp Captain Charles Atkinson Mackenzie, Army Ordnance Depot
Lieutenant Donald Mackenzie, King's Own Scottish Borderers
Temp Captain Eric Lofts Mackenzie, MB, Royal Army Medical Corps
Lieutenant Lionel do Anarel Mackenzie, Gordon Highlanders
Temp Lieutenant Norman Alexander Mackenzie, Royal Engineers
Quartermaster and Honorary Captain James Mackie, Gordon Highlanders
Temp Captain John Duncan Mackie, Argyll & Sutherland Highlanders
Captain Ronald Gillian Maclaine, Argyll & Sutherland Highlanders, attached Camel Corps, Egyptian Army
Captain Malcolm Neynoe Macleod, Royal Engineers
Temp Captain William Macleod, Royal Army Medical Corps
Captain Alan David Macpherson, Royal Field Artillery
Temp 2nd Lieutenant Albert Ewart Mainhood, Dorsetshire Regiment
Captain John Allan Freeman Mair, East Yorkshire Regiment
Temp 2nd Lieutenant Ralph Lionel Maitland-Heriot, Royal Field Artillery
2nd Lieutenant Robert Keith Makant, North Lancashire Regiment
Conductor Adam Malcolm, Army Ordnance Depot
Temp Lieutenant Wilfred Reginald Malone, Royal Irish Rifles
Temp Captain Alfred Malseed, MB, Royal Army Medical Corps
2nd Lieutenant Deane Mann, Royal West Surrey Regiment
2nd Lieutenant Douglas Mann, Somerset Light Infantry, attached Machine Gun Company
Temp 2nd Lieutenant Horatio Geoffrey Cornwallis Mann, Royal West Kent Regiment
Lieutenant John Charles Mann, Royal Welsh Fusiliers
2nd Lieutenant James Alexander Mansfield, Royal Irish Fusiliers
Temp Lieutenant George Malcolm Manuelle, Army Ordnance Depot
Captain Bernard Oswald March, Royal Field Artillery
Lieutenant George Frederick March, Nottinghamshire & Derbyshire Regiment
Temp 2nd Lieutenant Alan William Dobson Mark, Royal Engineers
Temp 2nd Lieutenant Herbert Henry Marks, Durham Light Infantry
Lieutenant Arthur Pelham Marriott, Royal Field Artillery
2nd Lieutenant Richard Brereton Marriott-Watson, Royal Irish Rifles
Temp Captain Wallace Marrs, General List
Captain Robert Marten Weymouth Marsden, Royal Engineers
Temp 2nd Lieutenant Gordon Marsh, Royal Berkshire Regiment
Lieutenant James Neville Marshall, Irish Guards
Captain Jeffery Eardley Marston, Royal Field Artillery
Temp Captain Claude Kennedy Martin, Devonshire Regiment
Regimental Sergeant Major David James Martin, Suffolk Regiment
2nd Lieutenant Edward Lancelot Martin, Royal Engineers
Temp Captain Jasper James Martin, Connaught Rangers
Captain Rutter Barry Martyn, Wiltshire Regiment and Royal Flying Corps
2nd Lieutenant Renould Marx, Royal Field Artillery
Temp Captain Laurence Mason, Royal Artillery
2nd Lieutenant William Ewart Mason, North Lancashire Regiment
Company Sergeant Major Herbert Mathews, Yorkshire Light Infantry
Temp Captain Duncan Mathieson, Northumberland Fusiliers
Temp Captain John Cuthbert Matthews, MB, Royal Army Medical Corps
Temp Captain Charles Raymond Maude, General List
Captain Godfrey Kindersley Maurice, Royal Army Medical Corps
Captain Ernest Cassel Maxwell, Cheshire Regiment
Temp Lieutenant Reginald Stewart Maxwell, General List and Royal Flying Corps
2nd Lieutenant Robert Watson McCrone, Royal Engineers
2nd Lieutenant Sylvester McDonald, Worcestershire Regiment
Temp Captain George Robert Denison McGeagh, Royal Army Medical Corps
Captain Hugh McConnell McHaffie, Argyll & Sutherland Highlanders
Rev. Joseph McHardy, Royal Army Chaplains' Department
Captain Kenneth Ian Maclver, Royal Garrison Artillery
Temp Captain John Walker McKenna, Royal Field Artillery
Company Sergeant Major Thomas McKenzie, Royal Warwickshire Regiment
Rev. Joseph Henry McKew, Royal Army Chaplains' Department
Quartermaster and Honorary Lieutenant William McKinley, Norfolk Regiment
Temp 2nd Lieutenant John Arthur McKinnell, Seaforth Highlanders
Temp Lieutenant Thomas McLachlan, Northumberland Fusiliers
2nd Lieutenant Alexander McLaren, Army Service Corps
Temp Captain William McLaren, Highland Light Infantry
Lieutenant Charles McMaster, General List, attached Trench Mortar Battery
Captain Hugh McMaster, Royal Field Artillery
Temp Lieutenant John McMurtrie, Royal Engineers
Company Sergeant Major William McNally, Worcestershire Regiment
Lieutenant Alfred George McNaught, Northamptonshire Regiment
Rev. James Henry McShane, Royal Army Chaplains' Department
Quartermaster and Honorary Lieutenant John Mead, Royal Flying Corps
Captain Gerald King Mears, Essex Regiment
Sergeant Major Alexander Measures, Leicestershire Regiment
Captain Paul Raymond Meautys, North Staffordshire Regiment
Lieutenant Edgar Julius Medley, Royal Field Artillery
Temp Lieutenant Leslie Woodfield Mellonie, Royal Garrison Artillery
Captain John Seymour Mellor, King's Royal Rifle Corps
Temp Captain Adam Fisher Menzies, Royal Army Medical Corps
Captain John Fergusson Menzies, Nottinghamshire & Derbyshire Regiment
2nd Lieutenant George Douglas Meredith, Royal Garrison Artillery
Temp Lieutenant Frederick Gordon Messervy, Royal Artillery
Temp 2nd Lieutenant R. J. Metcalfe, Devonshire Regiment
Temp Captain William Francis Mewton, Royal Engineers
Sergeant Major Albert Charles Middleton, Royal West Surrey Regiment
Temp Captain Kenneth Earl Millan, MB, Royal Army Medical Corps
Temp Captain Norman Shera Millican, Liverpool Regiment
2nd Lieutenant Percival Findlay Mills, Royal Engineers
2nd Lieutenant Charles Howard Goulden Millis, Nottinghamshire & Derbyshire Regiment
Captain John Milne, Gordon Highlanders
Rev. Garth Ewart Minnear, Royal Army Chaplains' Department
Captain Christopher Carrol Mitchell, Royal Field Artillery
Captain David Johnstone Mitchell, King's Royal Rifle Corps
2nd Lieutenant Harold Mitchell, West Yorkshire Regiment
Captain Thomas Bryson Mitchell, Royal Scots
Captain William Gore Sutherland Mitchell, Highland Light Infantry and Royal Flying Corps
Temp Captain Frederick Stewart Modera, Royal Fusiliers
2nd Lieutenant John Davenport Newal Molesworth, Lancashire Fusiliers
Captain Gordon Wickham Monier-Williams, London Regiment
2nd Lieutenant Frederick Thomas Monk, Scottish Rifles
Temp Lieutenant Charles Moore, Army Service Corps
2nd Lieutenant Morgan Edward Jellett Moore, Royal Irish Rifles
Captain John Theodore Cuthbert Moore-Brabazon, Royal Flying Corps
Captain Miles Ernest Morgan, Royal Engineers
Temp 2nd Lieutenant Tom Henry Emerson Morgan, Royal Engineers
Temp Captain Rupert Falshaw Morkill, Royal Engineers
Temp Major Cyril Clarke Boville Morris, Army Service Corps
Honorary Captain Frederick Morris, Army Ordnance Depot
Captain John Morris, MB , Royal Army Medical Corps, attached Cheshire Regiment
Temp 2nd Lieutenant George Ernest Morrison, Devonshire Regiment
Captain Richard Fielding Morrison, Royal Field Artillery
Captain Walter Francis Morrogh, Machine Gun Corps
Temp Lieutenant Owen Frederick Morshead, Royal Engineers
Captain Allen Handfield Morton, Royal Field Artillery and Royal Flying Corps
2nd Lieutenant Gilbert Douglas Morton, Liverpool Regiment
Lieutenant William Noel Jobson Moscrop, Durham Light Infantry
Lieutenant William Philipson Moss, Royal Irish Rifles
Captain Joseph Cecil Mary Mostyn, Royal Field Artillery
Captain Alfred Law Mowat, West Riding Regiment
Lieutenant Arthur Rupert Moxsy, Royal Inniskilling Fusiliers
2nd Lieutenant William Edward Heath Muir, Royal Scots
Captain Gerald Thomas Mullally, MB, Royal Army Medical Corps
Temp Captain Frederick James Mulqueen, Royal Engineers
Lieutenant David Campbell Duncan Munro, Gordon Highlanders
Temp 2nd Lieutenant William Thomson Murchie, Royal Scots Fusiliers, attached Trench Mortar Battery
2nd Lieutenant Charles Arthur Campbell Murdoch, Rifle Brigade
Lieutenant John Cyril Murley, London Regiment, attached Machine Gun Company
Lieutenant Edmund Victor Burke Murphy, Royal Irish Rifles
Temp Lieutenant Patrick Joseph Murphy, Leinster Regiment
Temp Captain Walter Murray, Royal Engineers
Temp Captain James Sproule Myles, Royal Inniskilling Fusiliers
Temp Major William Henry Napper, Army Service Corps
2nd Lieutenant Alfred Claude Nash, Royal Field Artillery, attached Trench Mortar Battery
Temp Captain Christopher Raleigh Nash-Wortham, Army Service Corps
Temp 2nd Lieutenant Frederick Charles Allan Campbell Neal, East Lancashire Regiment
Mechanic Sergeant Major Charles Blakely Neal, Army Service Corps
2nd Lieutenant Alan Skeffington Neale, Leicestershire Regiment
Temp Captain Frederick Theodore Neale, Oxfordshire & Buckinghamshire Light Infantry
2nd Lieutenant Pascall Needham, Royal Warwickshire Regiment
Temp 2nd Lieutenant Horace Hunter Neeves, Northumberland Fusiliers
Lieutenant Donald Francis Neilson, Lincolnshire Regiment
Temp Captain George Nesbit, Northumberland Fusiliers
Lieutenant Reginald William Newman, Gloucestershire Regiment
Captain Lanceray Arthur Newnham, Middlesex Regiment
Temp 2nd Lieutenant Thomas Newton, Lancashire Fusiliers
Captain Frederick John James Ney, Royal Army Medical Corps
Temp Captain Joseph Dallas Nicholl, Royal Irish Rifles
Lieutenant Francis Peter Ross Nichols, Army Service Corps
Captain Edward Hugh Jasper Nicolls, East Surrey Regiment
Temp Lieutenant Claud Robert Nightingale, Army Service Corps
Lieutenant Dudley Nisbet, South Lancashire Regiment
Temp Lieutenant John Borthwick Nixon, Northumberland Fusiliers
2nd Lieutenant Duncan Norman, Royal Engineers
Captain Geoffrey Schuyler Norman, Royal Irish Regiment
Lieutenant Louis Cameron Nott, Gloucestershire Regiment
Temp Lieutenant Douglas Oake, General List, attached Trench Mortar Battery
Lieutenant Henry John Percy Oakley, Royal Field Artillery
Captain John Cooke Power O'Brien, Royal Irish Fusiliers
Rev. Philip Francis Oddie, Royal Army Chaplains' Department
Temp 2nd Lieutenant Albert Edward Odell, General List, Royal Engineers
Lieutenant Bryan Bernard Joseph Aloysius O'Donnell, Royal Warwickshire Regiment, attached Machine Gun Corps
Captain Morgan John Winthrop O'Donovan, Royal Irish Fusiliers
Company Sergeant Major Charles Roby Oldfield, East Lancashire Regiment
Temp 2nd Lieutenant John Burleigh Oldfield, Northamptonshire Regiment
Lieutenant Edward Laurence Olivier, Liverpool Regiment
2nd Lieutenant John Denis Circuit Oliver, Royal Artillery, commanding Trench Mortar Battery
Captain John Barwick Orde, Royal Artillery
Lieutenant Herbert Joseph M. O'Reilly, Royal Irish Regiment
Temp Lieutenant Edward Russell Hugh Orford, Royal Munster Fusiliers
Temp 2nd Lieutenant Alan Ostler, Royal Field Artillery
Lieutenant Alexander Oswell, Durham Light Infantry
Captain Robert Edward Otter, London Regiment
2nd Lieutenant Charles Edward Ovington, London Regiment, attached Machine Gun Company
Captain Alfred Lloyd Owen, Royal Engineers
Temp Lieutenant Bertram Maurice Owen, Royal Engineers
Temp Lieutenant Edward John Baron Oxenham, Army Ordnance Depot
Lieutenant Herbert Anselm Oxenham, Royal Flying Corps
Captain Gerald Stewart Oxley, King's Royal Rifle Corps
Captain Francis Woodbine Parish, King's Royal Rifle Corps
Temp Lieutenant Horace Victor Parker, Royal Field Artillery
Sergeant Major Stanley John Parker, Wiltshire Regiment
Temp Lieutenant Wilfred Henry Parker, Suffolk Regiment
Temp Lieutenant Carol Lewis Parkin, Royal Field Artillery
Captain Herbert Denis Parkin, Army Service Corps
Captain Leslie Gerard Parkinson, Gloucestershire Regiment
Lieutenant John Wynand Parks, East Lancashire Regiment
Temp Lieutenant Wilfred Wharton Parr, Gloucestershire Regiment
Captain Montagu Martindale Parry-Jones, Royal Fusiliers
Temp Lieutenant William Linnell Partridge, Royal Army Medical Corps
Temp Lieutenant Arthur Alexander Adam Paterson, Royal Field Artillery
Temp 2nd Lieutenant James Hunter Patrick, King's Own Scottish Borderers
Lieutenant Laird Irvine Cassan Paul, Royal Field Artillery
2nd Lieutenant William Paul, West Yorkshire Regiment
Captain Denys Whitmore Payne, Royal Garrison Artillery
Lieutenant Ernest William John Payne, Royal Flying Corps
Temp Captain Joseph Payne, South Lancashire Regiment
2nd Lieutenant Arthur Henry Pearce, Royal Garrison Artillery
Temp Lieutenant Gerald Vyvyan Pearse, Royal Field Artillery
Temp Captain John Hesketh Pearson, Nottinghamshire & Derbyshire Regiment
2nd Lieutenant Ernest George Pease, Northumberland Fusiliers
2nd Lieutenant Edward Kenrick Bruce Peck, Manchester Regiment
Temp Lieutenant George Edgar Peck, Royal Engineers
Temp Captain John Norman Peck, Liverpool Regiment
Temp Lieutenant John Edward Pedley, King's Royal Rifle Corps
Temp Lieutenant Robert Peers, General List, attached Royal Engineers
Captain Vivian Humphrey Langford Pellew, Royal Garrison Artillery
Temp Lieutenant Albert James Pelling, Royal Engineers
Sergeant Major William Henry Pellin, Rifles Brigade
Temp 2nd Lieutenant Francis Seaton Pemberton, King's Royal Rifle Corps
Temp Captain Reginald Charles Penfold, Royal Fusiliers
Captain Frank Penn, Life Guards
Temp Lieutenant George Penna, King's Royal Rifle Corps
2nd Lieutenant Norman Montague Penny, Royal Field Artillery
Captain Thomas Eward Fraser Penny, Yorkshire Light Infantry
Lieutenant Claude Quayle Lewis Penrose, Royal Garrison Artillery
Lieutenant Robert Rawnsley Maxwell Perceval, Royal Field Artillery
Temp 2nd Lieutenant George Reginald Percy, Royal Engineers
Temp Captain Michael Perrin, North Lancashire Regiment
Captain Ivan Cockayne Pery-Knox-Gore, Royal Field Artillery
Lieutenant Frederick William Petrie-Hay, Gordon Highlanders, attached Machine Gun Company
Temp Lieutenant Michael Gladstone Pettigrew, Royal Army Medical Corps
Lieutenant Thomas Henry Peverell, Seaforth Highlanders
Captain Frederick William Pfeil, Royal Garrison Artillery
Temp 2nd Lieutenant Albert Edward Phelan, Northumberland Fusiliers
Battery Quartermaster Sergeant George Thomas Philip, Royal Scots
2nd Lieutenant Arnold Webb Phillips, Royal Fusiliers
Temp Lieutenant Geoffrey Phillips, Royal Field Artillery
Temp Lieutenant George Cuthbert Davidson Phillips, Royal Engineers
2nd Lieutenant Herbert Francis Picker, Royal Engineers
Temp Captain Gervas Evelyn Pierrepont, General List
Captain Frederick Alfred Pile, Headquarters, Royal Artillery
Lieutenant Eward Francis Pipe, East Yorkshire Regiment
Temp Captain John Herbert Piper, Northamptonshire Regiment
Temp Lieutenant Charles Harry Pitt, Royal Engineers
Company Sergeant Major John Alexander Pitt, Shropshire Light Infantry
Company Sergeant Major John Pittman, Northamptonshire Regiment
Lieutenant Walter Michael Hungerford Pollen, Scottish Rifles, commanding Machine Gun Company
Temp Lieutenant William Godfrey Thomas Pope, Royal Engineers
Temp Lieutenant Norman Porteous, Royal Engineers
2nd Lieutenant William Ford Porteous, Middlesex Regiment, attached Machine Gun Company
Captain Malcolm Tindal Porter, Royal Engineers
Temp Captain Edward Darley Powell, Royal Engineers
Captain Henry Royds Pownall, Royal Field Artillery
Lieutenant Acton Brooke Pratt, Worcestershire Regiment
Lieutenant Fendall William Harvey Pratt, Royal Garrison Artillery
Captain The Honourable Hubert Anthony John Preston, Royal Irish Regiment
Company Sergeant Major Charles Henry Price, Northumberland Fusiliers
Temp Lieutenant Charles Weaver Price, Machine Gun Company
2nd Lieutenant Herbert Allen Price, Somerset Light Infantry, attached Machine Gun Company
Temp Lieutenant Rhys Clifford Price, General List, attached Trench Mortar Battery
Sergeant Major William Price, Somerset Light Infantry
Captain Robert Ulick Hamilton Prioleau, Rifle Brigade
Temp Captain John Nelson Prior, Royal Engineers
Temp Lieutenant Leonard Browne Primrose, Royal Engineers
2nd Lieutenant Leslie Howson Pullen, London Regiment, attached Machine Gun Company
Captain Arthur William Purser, Royal Field Artillery
Company Sergeant Major Charles Robert Purnell, Rifle Brigade
Temp Captain Andrew Banks Raffle, MD, Royal Army Medical Corps
2nd Lieutenant William Raine, Liverpool Regiment
Lieutenant Rowan Scrope Rait-Kerr, Royal Engineers
Temp Captain Herwald Ramsbotham, General List
Temp 2nd Lieutenant William Marshall Ramsay, Northumberland Fusiliers
Captain Vincent Basil Ramsden, South Wales Borderers
Temp Lieutenant Douglas Estment Randall, Royal Field Artillery
2nd Lieutenant Vincent Washington Hobson Ranger, Oxfordshire & Buckinghamshire Light Infantry
Temp Lieutenant William Macalister Ransford, Royal Engineers
Temp Lieutenant Ronald Rawson Rawson, Royal Engineers
Lieutenant William Lister Read, Cheshire Regiment
Temp Captain Rupert Frederick William Rebsch, South Wales Borderers
Captain John Thorpe Reckitt, Army Service Corps
2nd Lieutenant Maurice Alexander Reddie, King's Royal Rifle Corps, attached Trench Mortar Battery
2nd Lieutenant Francis Vernon Lyne Redman, Royal Garrison Artillery
Rev. Lancelot George Reed, Royal Army Chaplains' Department
Temp Major Evan Thomas Rees, South Wales Borderers
2nd Lieutenant Wilford Norman Reeve, Dragoon Guards
Captain Brian Reeves, Royal Welsh Fusiliers
Captain Arthur William Reid, Royal Engineers
Rev. Herbert Reid, Royal Army Chaplains' Department
Temp Lieutenant Ernest Godwin Reidy, Royal Artillery
Captain William Charles Retallack, Royal Warwickshire Regiment
Lieutenant Roger Clayton Reynolds, Royal Field Artillery
Temp Lieutenant Frederick William Richards, Royal Engineers
Temp Captain Arthur Valentine Richardson, Yorkshire Regiment
Captain George Carr Richardson, Royal Field Artillery
Sergeant Major Richard Richardson, Durham Light Infantry
Temp Captain Arthur Richmond, MB, Royal Army Medical Corps
2nd Lieutenant William Frederick Richmond, East Lancashire Regiment
Lieutenant Herbert Leslie Ridley, Royal Dublin Fusiliers
2nd Lieutenant Charles Robinson Robbins, Royal Artillery and Royal Flying Corps
Temp Captain Frederick John Roberts, Nottinghamshire & Derbyshire Regiment
Temp Lieutenant Harold Roberts, Royal Engineers
2nd Lieutenant Norman Latimer Roberts, Royal Field Artillery (Special Reserve)
Temp Lieutenant James Huntley Robertson, Lancers
Temp Captain Charles Douglas Robinson, North Staffordshire Regiment
Temp Lieutenant Ernest Harold Robinson, Shropshire Light Infantry
Captain Sir Frederick Villiers Laud Robinson, Northamptonshire Regiment
Lieutenant Leslie George Robinson, Reserve of Officers
Temp Captain Thomas Gerald Robinson, Royal Berkshire Regiment
Temp 2nd Lieutenant John Patrick Roche, General List, attached Trench Mortar Battery
Captain James Roche-Kelly, South Irish Horse
Company Sergeant Major Sidney Herbert Roffey, London Regiment
Temp Lieutenant Roy Eyton Roller, Royal Field Artillery
2nd Lieutenant Francis Hugh Ronksley, Royal Engineers
Temp Lieutenant Richard Lang Roscoe, Royal Fusiliers
Temp Captain John Brenchley Rosher, Durham Light Infantry
Temp Lieutenant Percy Gilbert Ross-Hume, General List and Royal Flying Corps
Lieutenant Harry Ross-Skinner, Highland Light Infantry
Temp Captain Henry Joseph Round, Intelligence Corps
Acting 1st Class Battery Sergeant Major Arthur William Rouse, Army Service Corps
2nd Lieutenant Gilbert Rowan, Royal Highlanders
Lieutenant Robert Berkley Rowett, Royal Garrison Artillery
Temp Captain Sidney Douglas Rumbold, York & Lancaster Regiment
Temp Lieutenant Sidney Errell Rumsey, South Wales Borderers
Temp Lieutenant Charles Hermann Schmettan Runge, General List
2nd Lieutenant Edward Frederick Langley Russell, Liverpool Regiment
Temp Captain James Russell, Highland Light Infantry
Temp Captain Curteis Fraser Maxwell Norwood Ryan, Royal Engineers, Special Reserve
Rev. Frank Dowland Ryan, Royal Army Chaplains' Department
Captain Julian Neil Oscar Rycroft, Royal Highlanders
2nd Lieutenant Henry Sadler, Royal Sussex Regiment
Temp Captain Archibald Safford, Army Service Corps
Temp Captain Morice Julian St. Aubyn, King's Royal Rifle Corps
2nd Lieutenant Henry Alexander Sale, North Staffordshire Regiment, attached Machine Gun Company
2nd Lieutenant Arthur Joseph Samut, Wiltshire Regiment
Captain Samuel E. Sandars, Royal Fusiliers
Company Sergeant Major Vernus Frederic Bernard Sanders, Nottinghamshire & Derbyshire Regiment
Company Sergeant Major Douglas Sandilands, East Yorkshire Regiment
2nd Lieutenant William Mandeville Sankey, Monmouthshire Regiment
2nd Lieutenant James Edward Sargent, Royal Garrison Artillery
Temp 2nd Lieutenant Edward Eaton Sargint, Royal Irish Fusiliers
Lieutenant Reginald Stafford Saumarez, London Regiment
Temp 2nd Lieutenant Horace Charles Saunders, Royal West Surrey Regiment
Temp Captain Eric Humphrey Savill, Devonshire Regiment
2nd Lieutenant Underwood J. Saville, Cambridgeshire Regiment, attached Trench Mortar Battery
Temp Lieutenant Basil Sawers, Royal Engineers
Quartermaster and Honorary Lieutenant Edward James Sayer, Yeomanry
Temp Lieutenant Leslie Sayer, Royal Warwickshire Regiment
Captain Reginald Oscar Schwarz, King's Royal Rifle Corps
Sergeant Major Charles Alexander Scott, Royal Highlanders
Captain George Scott, MD, Royal Army Medical Corps
Captain James Alwin Colville Scott, Royal Army Medical Corps
Temp Lieutenant John James Scott, Royal West Kent Regiment
Temp 2nd Lieutenant Robert Henry Roe Scott, Royal Field Artillery, attached Trench Mortar Battery
Captain Montague Allan Hume Scott, Royal Engineers
Temp Lieutenant Sydney Clermont Scott, Essex Regiment
Temp Captain William Dishington Scott, Highland Light Infantry
Captain Thomas Henry Sebag-Montefiore, Royal Field Artillery
2nd Lieutenant Skinner Raymond Sebastian, Hampshire Regiment
Lieutenant Edwin Lloyd Sellars, Manchester Regiment
Temp Captain Edward Owen Sewell, General List
Temp Lieutenant Thomas Reginald Sewell, Royal Field Artillery
Captain Arthur Talbot Shakespear, Royal Engineers
Lieutenant William Shanks, Royal Engineers
Captain Bernard Marshall Rayment Sharp, East Yorkshire Regiment, commanding Machine Gun Company
Captain Frederick Roland Studdert Shaw, MB, Royal Army Medical Corps
Temp Captain George Murray Shaw MB, Royal Army Medical Corps
Company Sergeant Major John William Shaw, King's Royal Rifle Corps
Temp Captain William David Shaw, Highland Light Infantry
Temp Captain Albert Thomas Shead, Army Ordnance Depot
Temp 2nd Lieutenant Fraser Morton Sheard, General List, attached Trench Mortar Battery
Temp Lieutenant James Shelly, Royal Engineers
Temp Lieutenant John Chiene Shepherd, Royal Engineers
2nd Lieutenant Walter Scott Shepherd, Wiltshire Regiment
2nd Lieutenant Matthew Sheppard, Yorkshire Dragoons
Temp Captain Hudson Frederick Shepperd, Royal Irish Rifles
Lieutenant Alan Trevor Shipton, Middlesex Regiment
Captain Arthur Lafite Sidebottom, Royal Garrison Artillery
Temp 2nd Lieutenant Thomas Clifton Simpson, Unattended List, attached Royal Munster Fusiliers
Lieutenant Vere Elliot Ward Simpson, Royal Irish Regiment
Captain William Arthur John Simpson, Royal Field Artillery
Captain Frederick Alexander Single, Dragoon Guards
Company Sergeant Major Albert George Sirett, Oxfordshire & Buckinghamshire Light Infantry
Temp 2nd Lieutenant Alexander Patrick Skeil, Royal Scots Fusiliers
Temp Lieutenant Arthur James Skey, Royal Artillery
Temp Captain Roland Edgar Slade, Royal Engineers
Temp Lieutenant Charles Howard Slater, Royal Irish Rifles
Lieutenant Edward Vere Slater, Royal Engineers
Temp 2nd Lieutenant Stewart Beattie Slater, General List and Trench Mortar Battery
Lieutenant Cuthbert Sleigh, Royal Engineers
Lieutenant John Cotesworth Slessor, Royal Flying Corps
Captain Herbert Douglas Smart, Royal Army Medical Corps
Temp Captain Arthur Johnston Smith, Royal Engineers
2nd Lieutenant Alexander Francis Smith, Royal Field Artillery
Temp Lieutenant Augustus Featonby Smith, Royal Field Artillery
Sergeant Major Charles Smith, Leinster Regiment
Lieutenant Desmond Abel Smith, Grenadier Guards, attached Machine Gun Company
Temp Lieutenant Edward Thomas Smith, Liverpool Regiment
2nd Lieutenant George Stanley Edwin McGuiness Smith, North Staffordshire Regiment, attached Trench Mortar Battery
Temp Lieutenant Herbert Leyland Smith, Royal Engineers
Captain Ian Mackintosh Smith, Somerset Light Infantry
Temp Captain James Rockcliffe Smith, King's Royal Rifle Corps
Temp Captain Robert Arthur Smith, Royal Fusiliers
Company Sergeant Major William Arthur Smith, Royal Irish Regiment
2nd Lieutenant Walter Campbell Smith, London Regiment
2nd Lieutenant George Richard Gore Smyth, Liverpool Regiment
Temp Lieutenant Thomas Ralph Sneyd-Kinnersley, Royal Engineers
Captain William McElrea Snodgrass, MB, Royal Army Medical Corps
2nd Lieutenant Ernest Henry Soar, Royal Fusiliers, attached Machine Gun Company
Temp Captain Wilfred Newell Soden, MD, Royal Army Medical Corps
Captain Ernest George Sotham, Manchester Regiment
Captain Percy Gaisford Spackman, Royal Engineers
Lieutenant Richard Wedgwood Sparrow, Hussars
Honorary Lieutenant Gustave William Spears, Army Ordnance Depot
Temp Captain Malcolm Scott Speir, Royal Engineers
Lieutenant John Spence, Royal Engineers
Temp Quartermaster and Honorary Lieutenant Harry Spencer, Royal Fusiliers
Lieutenant Thomas Patrick Spens, Scottish Rifles
2nd Lieutenant Wilfrid James Maginnis Sproulle, West Riding Regiment, attached Machine Gun Company
2nd Lieutenant The Honourable Oliver Frederick George Stanley, Lancashire Hussars
Company Sergeant Major Albert Charles Statham, Royal Engineers
Lieutenant William Arthur Macdonald Stawell, Royal Engineers
Temp Lieutenant Howard Stedman, Indian Army
Temp Lieutenant Alexander Murray Stephen, Royal Garrison Artillery
Sergeant Major George Alfred Stephens, Royal Garrison Artillery
Lieutenant Talbert Stevenson, Royal Highlanders
Temp Captain William Scott Stevenson, Argyll & Sutherland Highlanders
2nd Lieutenant George Robert William Stewart, General List, commanding Trench Mortar Battery
Temp Lieutenant James Ernest Stewart, Royal Engineers
Temp Captain John Ebenezer Stewart, Border Regiment
Captain Colin Robert Hoste Stirling, Scottish Rifles
Temp Lieutenant William Hewitt Stitt, Royal Irish Fusiliers
Captain Arthur Edward Stokes-Roberts, Worcestershire Regiment
Captain Alan Gething Stone, Gurkha Rifles, Indian Army
Company Sergeant Major Frank Berry Stone, Royal Engineers
Captain Robert Graham William Hawkins Stone, Royal Engineers
2nd Lieutenant Richard Boys Stones, Durham Light Infantry
Captain Leonard Boole Stott, MB, Royal Army Medical Corps
Lieutenant William Strachan, Royal Field Artillery
2nd Lieutenant Donald Strange, Border Regiment
Temp 2nd Lieutenant Thomas Grainger Stewart, Royal Scots
Captain The Honourable James Gray Stuart, Royal Scots
Temp Captain William Grant Spruell Stuart, Cameron Highlanders
Captain Malden Augustus Studd, Royal Field Artillery
Temp 2nd Lieutenant William Edward Cedric Sturman, South Lancashire Regiment
Temp Honorary Captain Claude Francis Denny Suggate, Army Ordnance Depot
Captain Lional Randolph Coleridge Sumner, Gloucestershire Regiment
Temp Lieutenant David Campbell Suttie, MB, Royal Army Medical Corps
Captain Sir Richard Vincent Sutton, Life Guards
2nd Lieutenant Bertine Entwisle Sutton, Yeomanry, and Royal Flying Corps
2nd Lieutenant Desmond Sutton, London Regiment
Temp Captain Geoffrey Storrs Sutton, Liverpool Regiment
Captain Oliver Sutton-Nelthorpe, Rifle Brigade
Captain Matthew Sykes, Royal Garrison Artillery
Captain Samuel Stanley Sykes, West Yorkshire Regiment
Temp Lieutenant Alexander Symons, Middlesex Regiment
Temp Captain Gilbert George Symons, Cheshire Regiment
2nd Lieutenant Mark Winterbottom Tait, London Regiment, commanding Machine Gun Corps
Sergeant Major Alfred Tapp, Royal West Kent Regiment
2nd Lieutenant Arthur Gerard Tapp, Royal Field Artillery
Temp, Lieutenant Robert Bertram Tasker, Royal Engineers
Lieutenant Darcy Edward Derrick Taylor, Royal Fusiliers
Temp Lieutenant Eric Taylor, Royal Engineers
Captain George Pritchard Taylor, MB, Royal Army Medical Corps
Temp Lieutenant John Bentcliffe George Taylor, Rifle Brigade
Quartermaster and Honorary Captain James Eccles Taylor, Highland Light Infantry
Temp 2nd Lieutenant John George Taylor, Durham Light Infantry
Temp 2nd Lieutenant Oscar Percy Taylor, General List, attached Trench Mortar Battery
Captain Thomas Edgar Hugh Taylor, Royal Irish Regiment
Temp Lieutenant Francis Lewis Tempest, Suffolk Regiment
Captain George Temple, Royal Field Artillery
Temp Lieutenant Charles Twynam Teychenne, Royal Garrison Artillery
2nd Lieutenant Noel Thacker, Gloucestershire Regiment, attached Trench Mortar Battery
Captain Leslie Raymond Thoday, North Staffordshire Regiment
Temp Captain John Gibb Thorn, Gordon Highlanders
Lieutenant Albert Garnett Thomas, South Staffordshire Regiment
Temp 2nd Lieutenant Benjamin Stewart Buckingham Thomas, Welsh Regiment
Lieutenant Gwilym Ivor Thomas, Royal Field Artillery
Temp 2nd Lieutenant George Vinson Thomas, East Yorkshire Regiment
2nd Lieutenant Lionel Beaumont Thomas, Royal Horse Artillery
Captain Robert Clifford Lloyd Thomas, Monmouthshire Regiment
Temp Captain Ronald Hawkesby Thomas, Royal Engineers
Quartermaster and Honorary Lieutenant William Thomas, Royal Flying Corps
Temp Captain William Geoffrey Thomas, Royal Welsh Fusiliers
Temp 2nd Lieutenant Sidney Thompson, York & Lancaster Regiment, attached Machine Gun Company
Captain George Thomson, Yorkshire Light Infantry
Captain James Noel Thomson, Royal Artillery
Temp Lieutenant Percy Arthur Henry Thorniley, Manchester Regiment
2nd Lieutenant Augustine Patrick Thornton, Royal Irish Rifles
Temp Captain Francis Ruthven Thornton, Royal Army Medical Corps
Lieutenant Thomas Thornton, York & Lancaster Regiment
Lieutenant Roland Thorp, Royal Field Artillery Special Reserve
Captain James Oliver Thurburn, Royal Artillery
Lieutenant Arthur Cecil Ticehurst, Royal Engineers
Captain Ord Henderson Tidbury, Middlesex Regiment
Temp Captain Warwick Edward Tidy, Manchester Regiment
Lieutenant Alexander Tillett, Devonshire Regiment
Temp Lieutenant Stanley Day Timson, Royal Field Artillery
Temp Lieutenant Charles Godfrey Tindall, Royal West Kent Regiment
Captain William Tod, Royal Scots Fusiliers
Captain Edward Devereux Hamilton Tollemache, Coldstream Guards
Captain James Frederick Hugh Tomasson, Royal Artillery
2nd Lieutenant Geoffrey Stewart Tomkinson, Worcestershire Regiment
Temp Captain Gerald Edward Guy Tooth, Leicestershire Regiment
Temp Captain Gerald Franklin Torrey, General List
Captain Rowland Henry Towell, Royal Field Artillery
Captain Robert Beauchamp Tower, Nottinghamshire & Derbyshire Regiment
Lieutenant John Walter Heath Toynbee, East Kent Regiment, attached Machine Gun Company
Temp 2nd Lieutenant Harry Treacher, Royal Sussex Regiment
Temp. Captain Harold Richard Tuppen, Royal Army Service Corps
Company Sergeant Major Robert Turnbull, King's Own Scottish Borderers
Lieutenant Arthur Brooke Turner, Royal Warwickshire Regiment
Temp Captain Arthur Ward Turner, York & Lancaster Regiment
Temp Lieutenant Henry Moore Turner, Cheshire Regiment
2nd Lieutenant John Turner, Royal Warwickshire Regiment
2nd Lieutenant Sydney Ward Turner, Suffolk Regiment
Captain Algernon Corbet Turnor, Royal Horse Guards
Temp Major Thomas Frederic Tweed, Lancashire Fusiliers
Temp Lieutenant Cunningham Burnside Tweedie, King's Own Scottish Borderers
Temp Lieutenant Cyril Douglas Twynam, Royal Engineers
2nd Lieutenant Frederick Tymms, South Lancashire Regiment
Lieutenant Thomas Tyrwhitt-Drake, Oxfordshire & Buckinghamshire Light Infantry
Lieutenant Charles Edward Tyson, Royal Field Artillery
Temp 2nd Lieutenant John Hodgson Tyson, Royal Field Artillery
Captain Lyndall Fownes Urwick, Worcestershire Regiment
2nd Lieutenant Silas Charles Richardson Usher, Royal Engineers
Captain John Edward Utterson-Kelso, Royal Scots Fusiliers
Lieutenant Henry Havelock d'Estamps Vallancey, Royal Field Artillery
Honorary Captain Albert Robert Valon, Army Ordnance Depot
Temp Lieutenant Stanley Charles Vickers, Royal Engineers
Temp Lieutenant John Furse Bancroft Vidal, Royal Engineers
Lieutenant Thomas Whitehair Vigers, Royal Engineers
Captain William Bernard Vince, London Regiment
Temp Lieutenant Gordon Philip Voss, Motor Machine Gun Corps
Temp Captain Charles Douglas Waddell, General List, attached Trench Mortar Battery
Temp Lieutenant Henry Charles Calderwood Walkem, Royal Engineers
Captain George Croxton Walker, Royal Engineers
Temp Captain Arthur Walker, West Yorkshire Regiment
2nd Lieutenant Jeffrey Walker, Royal Warwickshire Regiment
Temp Lieutenant James Thomas Walker, Royal Garrison Artillery
Captain William Keating Walker, Machine Gun Service
Temp Captain Arthur Jewell Walkey, Royal Inniskilling Fusiliers
Temp Lieutenant Henry Benedict Wall, Royal Engineers
Lieutenant Archibald Lyle Wallace, Royal Field Artillery, attached Trench Mortar Battery
Temp 2nd Lieutenant James Clarke Wallace, Royal Engineers
Captain John Thornhill Wallace, Royal Horse Artillery, attached 8th Divisional Trench Mortar
Temp Captain Herbert William Waller, Northumberland Fusiliers
Temp Captain Percy Warbrick, Royal Engineers
Lieutenant Richard Percyvale Ward, Royal Welsh Fusiliers
Temp Captain Victor Ward Brown, General List
Captain Mark Kingsley Wardle, Leicestershire Regiment
Temp Lieutenant George MacDowell Warner, King's Royal Rifle Corps
Rev. Wynyard Alexander Warner, Royal Army Chaplains' Department
Temp Lieutenant John Warnock, Royal Engineers
Captain William Robert Vaughton Warren, Army Service Corps
2nd Lieutenant Arthur Edward Wass, Hussars
Captain George Guy Waterhouse, Royal Engineers
Captain Michael Theodore Waterhouse, Yeomanry
2nd Lieutenant Horace Frank Waters, London Regiment
Temp 2nd Lieutenant William Clifford Watkin, Royal Engineers
Captain Forrester Colvin Watson, Hussars
Captain Frank Leslie Watson, West Yorkshire Regiment
2nd Lieutenant Joseph Herbert Watson, Royal Engineers
Captain Thomas Hovenden Watson, Worcestershire Regiment
2nd Lieutenant James Watt, King's Own Scottish Borderers
Acting Regimental Sergeant Major Albert Watts, North Lancashire Regiment
Temp Lieutenant Robert Watts, Army Service Corps
Temp Captain Thomas Hall Waugh, Northumberland Fusiliers
2nd Lieutenant George Sholto Ripley Webb, Royal Berkshire Regiment, attached Trench Mortar Battery
Temp Captain Maurice Everett Webb, Royal Engineers
Temp Captain Noel William Webb, Royal Flying Corps
Lieutenant Percy Lovell Webb, London Regiment
Temp Lieutenant Basil Courtenay Victor Weeks, Royal Marines
Lieutenant Ronald Morce Weeks, South Lancashire Regiment
Captain John Francis Jessop Weiss, Royal Berkshire Regiment
Temp Captain Ronald Sidney Panton Wells, Royal Field Artillery
Lieutenant Thomas Clinton Wells, Welsh Regiment
Temp Captain Percy B. Welton, Royal Welsh Fusiliers
Lieutenant Edward Wenham, Kings Royal Rifle Corps
Temp Captain Reginald Francis West, General List
Temp Captain George Cecil Westbrook Westbrooke, Royal Welsh Fusiliers
Temp Lieutenant Harry Westwood, Royal Engineers
2nd Lieutenant Ralph Gates Wever, Royal Engineers
Captain Arthur Weyman, Leicestershire Regiment
Temp 2nd Lieutenant John Wharton, South Staffordshire Regiment
Temp Captain Ellis George Whately, Hertfordshire Regiment
Lieutenant John Ben Wheater, Army Service Corps
2nd Lieutenant Bertram Seymour Whidborne, Royal Field Artillery, attached Trench Mortar Battery
Rev. Richard Whincup, MA, Royal Army Chaplains' Department
Temp Captain Henry Whittaker, Royal Engineers
2nd Lieutenant John Tudor Whitaker, Army Service Corps and Royal Flying Corps
Lieutenant Cecil William Keane White, Royal Horse Artillery
Temp 2nd Lieutenant Noel Blanco White, General List
Temp Lieutenant William White, Highland Light Infantry
2nd Lieutenant Bernard Whiteman, Royal Sussex Regiment
Temp Captain Brian William Wibberley, MB, Royal Army Medical Corps
2nd Lieutenant Henry William Wiebkin, Royal Artillery
Temp 2nd Lieutenant Henry Wild, Northumberland Fusiliers
Temp Lieutenant George Thomas Wilkes, East Surrey Regiment
Lieutenant Cyril Francis Wilkins, Royal Irish Rifles
2nd Lieutenant Thomas Wilkins, Royal Field Artillery
2nd Lieutenant Alfred Wilkinson, Durham Light Infantry, commanding Trench Mortar Battery
2nd Lieutenant Louis John Austin Will, Worcestershire Regiment
2nd Lieutenant Harry Willans, Bedfordshire Regiment
Temp Captain David Llewelyn Williams, Royal Army Medical Corps
Honorary Lieutenant and Temp Captain Gerard William Williams, Royal Engineers
Battery Sergeant Major Henry Alfred Williams, Royal Artillery
Captain Arthur Reginald Williamson, Durham Light Infantry
Captain Maurice Joseph Williamson, Royal Army Medical Corps
Temp Lieutenant Thomas Roy Williamson, Royal Fusiliers
Temp Lieutenant William Henry Rowe Williamson, Army Service Corps
Lieutenant Henry Urmston Willink, Royal Field Artillery
Temp Captain Harvey Thew Willmer, Liverpool Regiment
Temp Captain Bassett FitzGerald Wilson, General List
Temp Captain Edward Arthur Wilson, Royal Engineers
Temp Captain Frederick Gordon Wilson, Northumberland Fusiliers
Temp Captain Gavin Laurie Wilson, Argyll & Sutherland Highlanders
Temp Captain Ivan Stuart Wilson, MD, Royal Army Medical Corps
Temp Captain John Wolseley Wilson, Gloucestershire Regiment
Captain Percy Norton Whitestone Wilson, Royal Fusiliers
Captain Francis William Wilson-Fitzgerald, Dragoons
Temp 2nd Lieutenant Charles William Winkley, Machine Gun Corps
Temp Captain Ernest Arthur Winter, Royal Fusiliers
Temp 2nd Lieutenant Charles Edward Witcomb, Gloucestershire Regiment
Captain Frank Hole Witts, Irish Guards
Captain Robert Wolrige-Gordon, Grenadier Guards
Lieutenant Alexander Lyttleton Wood, South Staffordshire Regiment
Captain John Hutchinson Wood, MB, Royal Army Medical Corps
Captain Edward Ambrose Woods, Royal Field Artillery
Lieutenant James Woods, Royal Field Artillery
Temp 2nd Lieutenant Hubert Worsley Woolley, Royal Field Artillery
Lieutenant Albert Edward Worrall, King's Own Scottish Borderers
Captain Hugh Gildart Worsley, Royal Field Artillery
Temp Captain Thomas Ryland Worthington, Manchester Regiment
Captain Walter Gustavus Worthington, London Regiment
Temp Lieutenant Sidney Murray Wren, Royal Engineers
Temp Captain Joseph Herbert Wright, Gloucestershire Regiment
Rev. J. Jackson Wright, Royal Army Chaplains' Department
2nd Lieutenant Philip Lowndes Wright, Oxfordshire & Buckinghamshire Light Infantry
Temp 2nd Lieutenant Sidney George Wright, Royal West Kent Regiment
Captain Francis Piers Wye, Royal Field Artillery
Lieutenant Philip Herbert Wykeham, Royal Artillery
Lieutenant Jasper William George Wyld, Oxfordshire & Buckinghamshire Light Infantry
Temp Captain Robert Meredydd Wynne-Edwards, Royal Welsh Fusiliers
Lieutenant Victor Alexander Campbell Yate, Durham Light Infantry
Quartermaster and Honorary Major Alexander Preston Yeadon, Cameron Highlanders
Temp Lieutenant Oliver Kinnard York, Gloucestershire Regiment
Company Sergeant Major Charles Percy Young, Middlesex Regiment
Temp 2nd Lieutenant Hugh Young, Royal Inniskilling Fusiliers
Temp Captain John Miller Young, MB, Royal Army Medical Corps
Lieutenant Keith de Lorentz Young, Indian Army
Temp Lieutenant Henry Waldo Yoxall, King's Royal Rifle Corps
Temp Lieutenant Nelson Zambra, Royal Artillery

Australian Imperial Force
Lieutenant Robert Clegg Åland, Infantry Battalion
Captain Harold Mathieson Beiers, Infantry Battalion
Captain James Bentley, Army Medical Corps
Captain John Bright Birch, Army Medical Corps
Captain Arthur Richard Blainey, Infantry Battalion
Lieutenant Charles Adrian Boccard, Infantry Battalion
Captain William Bridgeford, Machine Gun Company
Captain Horace Clowes Brinsmead, Infantry Battalion
Lieutenant Arnold Brown, Infantry Battalion
Lieutenant Harcourt Earl Douglas Brown, Trench Mortar Battery, Field Artillery
Lieutenant John Leslie Gibson Buckland, Engineers
Lieutenant Reginald Clive Callister, Machine Gun Corps
Captain Henry Gervais Lovatt Cameron, Infantry Battalion
Captain Gordon Cathcart Campbell, Infantry Battalion, attached Machine Gun Section
Lieutenant Harrison McDowell Campbell, Infantry Battalion
Captain Richard Gardiner Casey, Volunteer Automobile Corps
Lieutenant Launcelet Arthur Cleveland, Field Artillery
Lieutenant Cyril Albert Clowes, Field Artillery
Captain Norman Clowes, Headquarters, Artillery
Captain Frederick Lawrence Coldwell-Smith, Infantry Battalion
Captain Arthur Edmund Colvin, Army Medical Corps
Lieutenant Guy Kennedy Davenport, Field Artillery Brigade
Captain William McIntyre Davis, Infantry Battalion
Captain Arthur William Dodd, Field Artillery
Captain Francis Henry Dunn, Infantry Battalion
Lieutenant Walter Edmund Swan Edgar, Infantry Battalion
Lieutenant Thomas Arthur Fairfax, Infantry Battalion
Lieutenant James Joseph Fay, Infantry Battalion
Lieutenant Ernest John Ferguson, Artillery, attached Trench Mortar Battery
Captain William Reginald Rogers Ffrench, Machine Gun Company
Captain Eric Mortley Fisher, Army Medical Corps
Sergeant Major Albert Henry Percy Fleming, Infantry Battalion
Captain Alexander Moore Forbes, Field Artillery
Captain Frederick Edward Forrest, Artillery
Captain Walter Fowler-Brownsworth, Army Service Corps
Captain Richard Allen Geddes, Infantry Battalion
Rev. Patrick James Gilbert, Royal Army Chaplains' Department
Rev. Edward O'Sullivan Goidanich, Royal Army Chaplains' Department
Captain John MacDonald Grant, Engineers
Captain Charles Berry Grieve, Army Service Corps
Captain Charles Guilfoyle, Infantry Battalion
2nd Lieutenant Walter Rieve Hallahan, Infantry Battalion
Major Norman Charles Harris, Engineers
Captain Charles Henry Harrison, Infantry Battalion
Captain the Rev. Joseph Hearn, Royal Army Chaplains' Department
Lieutenant William Frederick Hinman, Infantry Battalion
Captain Frederick Brock Hinton, Light Horse Regiment, attached Machine Gun Company
Captain Arnold Kingsley Hosking, Infantry Battalion
Major William Inglis, Infantry Battalion
Captain Walter William James, Engineers
Captain John Thomas Jones, Army Medical Corps
Captain Harold Reginald Koch, Infantry Battalion
Lieutenant Elmer Winfred Drake Laing, Infantry Battalion
Captain John Henry McElroy, Infantry Battalion
Captain George Stanley McIlroy, Infantry Battalion
Captain Donald Alexander McNab, Infantry Battalion, attached Trench Mortar Battery
Captain Mafra William McVeau, Infantry Battalion
Captain Douglas Gray Marks, Infantry Battalion
Captain Gordon Louis Maxfield, Infantry Battalion
Captain Charles Beverley Metcalfe, Army Medical Corps
Lieutenant Christopher Kenneth Millar, Infantry Battalion
Captain Thomas George Millner, Army Service Corps
Captain Clarence Frank Mills, Australian Engineers
Captain Keith Officer, Light Horse Brigade
Captain Lowell Thomas Oscar Pedler, Pioneer Battalion
Sergeant Major William John Phillips, Field Artillery
Lieutenant William Elmhurst Potts, Engineers
Captain Hugh Dougas Pulling, Infantry Battalion
Lieutenant Cyril George Ross, Infantry Battalion
Captain William Henry Sanday, Pioneer Battalion
Captain James Edmund Savage, Army Service Corps
Captain Edgar Geoffrey Sawer, Infantry Battalion, attached Machine Gun Company
Lieutenant William Charles Scurry, Infantry Battalion, attached Trench Mortar Battery
Captain Ivan Brunker Sherbon, Infantry Battalion
Captain George Douglas Smith, Headquarters
Captain Carl Speckman, Pioneer Battalion
Captain Geoffrey Lewis Strachan, Field Artillery
Captain David Thomson, Infantry Battalion
Captain Harold Edward Townsend, Pioneer Battalion
Captain Charles George Walklate, Infantry Battalion
Lieutenant Albert Edward Wallis, Artillery, attached Trench Mortar Battery
2nd Lieutenant Herbert Fraser Watson, Infantry Battalion
Captain Stanley Holm Watson, Engineers
Captain Albert Ernest Wearne, Light Horse Regiment, Australian Imperial Force
Captain Eric Norman Webb, Engineers
Lieutenant Ernest Leslie Wilcock, Infantry Battalion
Major Aubrey Roy Liddon Wiltshire, Infantry Battalion
Captain Percy William Woods, Infantry
Lieutenant Hugh Wrigley, Infantry Battalion
2nd Lieutenant Charles Frederick Yeadon, Infantry Battalion

Canadian Forces
Captain William Douglas Adams, Infantry Battalion
Captain Douglass Harvey Barnett, Infantry Battalion
Lieutenant Harold Grafton Barnum, Infantry Battalion
Lieutenant Charles Austin Bell, Engineers
Captain John Kay Beveridge, Infantry Battalion
Lieutenant Percy Vere Binns, Engineers
Captain George Howard Bradbrooke, Mounted Rifles Battalion
Lieutenant Frederick Archibald Brewster, Canadian Engineers
Captain Alexander Douglas Cameron, Lord Strathcona's Horse
Captain Alue Edward Cameron, Royal Army Veterinary Corps
Captain John Forin Campbell, Pioneer Battalion
Lieutenant John Robert Cartwright, Infantry Battalion
Captain Dameral Aubrey Clarke, Princess Patricia's Canadian Light Infantry
Temp Lieutenant Roger Fyfe Clarke, Canadian Engineers
Lieutenant Cuthbert Peart Coatsworth, Pioneer Battalion
Captain Percy Edward Colman, Mounted Rifles Battalion
Company Sergeant Major James Collett, Infantry Battalion
Lieutenant Graham Cruickshank, Mounted Rifles Battalion
Captain Herbert McMillan Dawson, Cavalry Regiment
Captain James Arnold Delancey, Infantry Battalion
Lieutenant Duncan Fraser Dewar, Engineers
Captain Angus Alexander Drinnan, Army Medical Corps
Lieutenant Robert Lionel Dunsmore, Engineers
Captain Alfred Eastham, Machine Gun Service
Lieutenant Harold Lee Fetherstonhaugh, Field Artillery
Sergeant Major Edward Eleazar Frost, Pioneer Battalion
Temp Honorary Major Rev. Alexander MacLennan Gordon, Royal Army Chaplains' Department
Lieutenant Oswald Wetherald Grant, Infantry Battalion
Captain The Honourable Francis Egerton Grosvenor, Infantry Battalion
Captain Ralph Price Harding, Field Artillery
Lieutenant John Percival Harvey, Engineers
Captain Charles Francis Hawkins, Machine Gun Service
Captain Patrick Hennessy, Army Service Corps
Captain Harry Edmund Hodge, Infantry Battalion, attached Machine Gun Company
Lieutenant James Parker Hooper, General List
Captain Eugene Harvey Houghton, Infantry Battalion, attached Machine Gun Company
Captain Cyrus Fiske Inches, Artillery
Lieutenant Frank Edward Harte Johnson, Army Service Corps
Sergeant Major Thomas Fred Jordan, Infantry Battalion
Lieutenant William Harold Kippen, Infantry Battalion
Lieutenant Clarence Lea, Mounted Rifles Battalion
Captain Allan Leavitt, Engineers
Captain Frederick William Lees, Army Medical Corps
Lieutenant James Hubert Leeson, Engineers
Captain Robert Marsden Luton, Army Medical Corps
Captain James Ernest McAskill, Army Medical Corps
Lieutenant Angus Gillis Macauley, Canadian Engineers
Captain George Cross McDonald, Princess Patricia's Canadian Light Infantry
Lieutenant Donald Henry Macfarlane, Engineers
Lieutenant Malcolm MacAdam McGregor, Infantry Battalion
Captain David Livingstone McKeand, Infantry Battalion
Lieutenant Francis Harold McLorg, Infantry Battalion
Lieutenant John Barkley Mason, Engineers
Captain Herbert Molson, Infantry Battalion
Captain Percival John Montague, Infantry Battalion, Deputy Assistant Adjutant General, Headquarters
Major Lafayette Harry Nelles, Infantry Battalion
Lieutenant Francis Philip Douglas Newland, Infantry Battalion
Captain William Freeman Nicholson, Army Medical Corps
Lieutenant George Waller de Courcy O'Grady, Infantry Battalion
Lieutenant George Paterson, Infantry Battalion
Lieutenant Harry Bronghall Pepler, Infantry Battalion
Lieutenant Harold Phillips, Royal Canadian Regiment
Captain Paul Poisson, Army Medical Corps
Captain Charles Frederick Clauston Porteous, Divisional Headquarters
Captain Raymond Pouncey, Infantry Battalion, attached Trench Mortar Battery
Lieutenant Charles G. Power, Infantry Battalion
Captain George Purves, Infantry Battalion
Temp Captain Alan Bruce Ritchie, Canadian Engineers
Lieutenant John Hamilton Roberts, Royal Horse Artillery
Lieutenant Andrew Murray Robertson, Engineers
Captain George Ross Robertson, Infantry Battalion
Captain Walford Douglas Somerled Rorison, Army Medical Corps
Captain Percy Guy Routh, Mounted Infantry Battalion
Lieutenant Hugh Millar Rowe, Pioneer Battalion
Captain Edward James Carson Schmidlin, Headquarters, Divisional Engineers
Lieutenant John Westry Stagg, Infantry Battalion
Lieutenant Richard Winslow Stayner, Mounted Rifles Battalion
Captain Douglas Hinch Storms, Field Artillery
Captain Kenneth Stuart, Engineers
Captain Thomas Alexander Hatch Taylor, Infantry Battalion, attached Machine Gun Company
Captain Robert Grant Thackray, Divisional Artillery Headquarters
Lieutenant Gilbert Tyndale-Lea, Field Artillery
Captain Lawrence Bertram Unwin, Infantry Battalion
Captain Hugh McIntyre Urquhart, Infantry Battalion
Captain Francis Alfred Wilkin, Motor Machine Gun Brigade
Lieutenant Frank Scott Winser, Infantry Battalion
Captain Richard Worrall, Infantry Battalion
Lieutenant Ernest James Young, Engineers

Egyptian Army
El Saghkolaghasi Mahmud Bahgat (Effendi), S.O. to Camel Corps
El Saghkolaghasi Mahmud Hafez (Effendi), Staff
El Saghkolaghasi Mohammed Hassan (Effendi), Military Works Department
El Saghkolaghasi Mohammed Niazi (Effendi), Cavalry
El Yuzbashi Ali Islam (Effendi), Artillery
El Yuzbashi El Sayed Ferid (Effendi), Department of Stores
El Yuzbashi Hussein Taher (Effendi), Arab Battalion
El Yuzbashi Mabruk Fiki (Effendi), Sudanese
El Yuzbashi Mahmud Shukri (Effendi), Sudanese
El Yuzbashi Musa Khouri Zakharia (Effendi), Medical Corps
El Yuzbashi Nasralla El Burgi (Effendi), Medical Corps
El Mulazim Awal Abdulla Adam Gabril (Effendi), Camel Corps
El Mulazim Awal Ahmed Ibrahim (Effendi)
El Mulazim Awal Azab Selim (Effendi)
El Mulazim Awal Mohammed Talat (Effendi), Veterinary Department
El Mulazim, Awal Mohammed Yuzri (Effendi), Artillery
El Mulazim Awal Shaker Mansur El Rubi (Effendi)
El Mulazim, Tahi Suleiman Omar (Effendi)
El Mulazim Tahi Zeki Ali Ghonaim (Effendi)

Newfoundland Contingent
Captain Arthur Raley, Newfoundland Regiment
Captain Reginald Rowsell, Newfoundland Regiment

New Zealand Imperial Force
2nd Lieutenant Leonard Stewart Carmichael, Field Artillery
Captain Donald Dobson, Canterbury Regiment
Lieutenant Alexander Smith Falconer, Otago Regiment
2nd Lieutenant Stanley Gordon Guthrie, Wellington Regiment
Lieutenant Turu Hiroti, Pioneer Battalion
Captain Alfred Ernest Horwood, Field Artillery
Captain Lindsay Merritt Inglis, Machine Gun Company, Rifle Brigade
Captain Leonard Handforth Jardine, Wellington Battalion
Captain Charles Victor Leeming, Field Artillery
Lieutenant Hugh Edgar McKinnon, Wellington Battalion
Captain Robert Stirrat Macquarrie, Field Artillery
Captain John Llewellyn Charles Merton, Canterbury Regiment
Captain Reginald Miles, Field Artillery
Captain Robert Nicoll Morpeth, Auckland Regiment
Captain Harry McKellar White Richardson, Staff Corps
Honorary Captain George Sandham, Army Medical Corps
Captain James Garfield Stewart, Army Service Corps
Captain Alan Duncan Stitt, Canterbury Regiment
Lieutenant William Francis Tracey, Otago Regiment
Lieutenant Stanley Hugh William Widdowson, Otago Regiment, attached Trench Mortar Battery
Captain William George Wray, Otago Regiment

South African Forces
Captain and Adjutant Harry William Morrey Bamford, Infantry
Captain and Adjutant Claude Melville Browne, Infantry Battalion
2nd Lieutenant Garnet George Green, Infantry Battalion
Captain Rev. Eustace St Clair Hill, South African Chaplains' Department
Lieutenant Robert Poole, Signal Company, Engineers
Lieutenant Finlay Mack Ross, Signal Company, Engineers
Lieutenant John Lindsay Shenton, Infantry Battalion
Captain Sydney Wallis Elliot Style, Infantry Battalion

In recognition of their gallantry and devotion to duty in the Field 
Captain Charles Looker Awbery, Essex Regiment, attached Cambridgeshire Regiment. For conspicuous gallantry in action. He led his company direct to the final objective, and got into touch with the battalions on his right and left, sending his report to battalion headquarters. He carried out a difficult operation with great courage and skill.
Temp Lieutenant William Greville Bain, Royal Field Artillery. For conspicuous gallantry in action. He displayed great courage and determination when acting as Forward Observation Officer. On another occasion he commanded his battery with great skill and himself rescued several wounded men under fire.
Temp Captain Ian Alexander Baxter, Royal Welsh Fusiliers. For conspicuous gallantry in action. He displayed great coolness and courage in reorganising the front line under heavy fire. He set a splendid example throughout.
Temp Sub-Lieutenant Daniel Marcus William Beak, Royal Naval Volunteer Reserve. For conspicuous gallantry in action. He led his men in the attack with great courage and initiative and materially assisted in the capture of the enemy line. He set a fine example throughout.
2nd Lieutenant George Arthur Oswald Berridge, Royal Field Artillery. For conspicuous gallantry in action. He carried a wounded orderly to a place of safety under heavy fire. On another occasion he remained out with a wounded officer until dark and then brought him to our lines.
2nd Lieutenant Bertram Okeden Bircham, Hampshire Regiment. For conspicuous gallantry in action. He organised his own and another company under heavy fire and reinforced the attacking line at a critical time. He set a splendid example of courage and coolness throughout.
2nd Lieutenant James Arthur Blackey, Royal Field Artillery. For conspicuous gallantry in action. He displayed great courage and skill when observing under very heavy fire, and sent back most valuable information. Later, he carried a wounded man over the open into safety.
Temp Lieutenant Leonard Mark Blomenstock, Royal Field Artillery. For conspicuous gallantry in action. He displayed great courage and determination when observing for his battery, thereby being chiefly responsible that the enemy's wire was well cut. He has at all times set a splendid example.
Temp 2nd Lieutenant Edmund Charles Blunden, Royal Sussex Regiment. For conspicuous gallantry in action. He displayed great courage and determination when in charge of a carrying party under heavy fire. He has previously done fine work.
Temp Sub-Lieutenant Boyden Frank Bowerman, Royal Naval Volunteer Reserve. For conspicuous gallantry in action. He rallied considerable numbers of men and led them forward under heavy fire. He set a splendid example of courage and coolness throughout.
Temp 2nd Lieutenant Vernon Bowmer, Nottinghamshire & Derbyshire Regiment. For conspicuous gallantry in action. He led his platoon with great dash and showed marked initiative and ability. He organised bombing parties and accounted for a large number of Germans.
Temp 2nd Lieutenant Arthur Herbert Britten, Gloucestershire Regiment. For conspicuous gallantry in action. He displayed great courage and ability when in charge of the newly captured front, and greatly assisted in the organisation and defence of the line. He set a fine example throughout.
Captain George Macdonald Brown, Hertfordshire Regiment. For conspicuous gallantry in action. Grasping the situation and taking on his duties as Brigade Major at a critical time, he carried out invaluable work and showed marked courage and ability.
2nd Lieutenant Francis Alfred Cook, York & Lancaster Regiment. For conspicuous gallantry in action. He carried out a dangerous reconnaissance under heavy fire, and obtained most valuable information. Later, he assisted to rescue a wounded man.
Temp Lieutenant Roger Coughtrie, Royal Garrison Artillery. For conspicuous gallantry in action. He rescued under heavy fire several men who had been buried in a dug-out. On another occasion he displayed great courage and determination in keeping his guns in action under the most trying conditions.
Temp 2nd Lieutenant John Francis Cox, Royal Dublin Fusiliers. For conspicuous gallantry in action. He organised a bombing party and led them forward against a strong point, shooting three enemy snipers with his own hand. He set a fine example of courage and coolness throughout. He was wounded.
Temp Lieutenant Ronald Fairbridge Currey, Argyll & Sutherland Highlanders, attached Royal Highlanders. For conspicuous gallantry in action. He carried out several valuable reconnaissances prior to the attack. Later, he carried out a daring reconnaissance under heavy fire and obtained most valuable information.
Temp Lieutenant Bernard Dangerfield, Royal Naval Volunteer Reserve. For conspicuous gallantry in action. He established and maintained communication under very heavy fire. Later, he carried out a dangerous reconnaissance and led a considerable number of men forward who were held up.
2nd Lieutenant Terence Downing, Royal Fusiliers. For conspicuous gallantry in action. Although wounded, he crawled back to report the situation, and then returned and withdrew his company without loss under cover of dusk. He set a fine example throughout.
Captain Charles Hertel Egerton, Royal Engineers. For conspicuous gallantry in action. He displayed marked energy and courage, and by his example encouraged his men in their work of clearing a road under heavy fire. He carried out a valuable reconnaissance.
Temp Lieutenant Edward Vezian Ellis, Royal Naval Volunteer Reserve. For conspicuous gallantry in action. He led a counter bombing attack down the enemy second line trench, which had been only partially occupied by our troops, and was instrumental in capturing a number of prisoners.
Lieutenant Daniel Davies Evans, Royal Army Medical Corps, attached Royal Dublin Fusiliers. For conspicuous gallantry and devotion to, duty. He displayed great courage and determination in collecting, and attending to the wounded tinder very heavy fire.
Temp Captain Rupert Farrant, Royal Army Medical Corps, attached Shropshire Light Infantry. For conspicuous gallantry and devotion to duty. During the whole day he tended wounded in an open trench which was subjected to a violent bombardment. On one occasion he led a party into "No Man's Land" and brought in several wounded men.
2nd Lieutenant Lionel Robert D'Arcy Fisher, Hertfordshire Regiment. For conspicuous gallantry in action. He led his platoon in the attack with great gallantry and captured his objective. Later, he rendered most valuable services during the consolidation of the position.
Captain Richard Nagle Ford, Royal Fusiliers. For conspicuous gallantry in action. He twice went out under very heavy fire to ascertain the situation, thereby rendering most valuable assistance at a critical time. He set a fine example throughout.
Temp Sub-Lieutenant Frank Oliver Forrester, Royal Naval Volunteer Reserve. For conspicuous gallantry in action. He led a party of 20 men into an enemy trench with great gallantry and captured 129 prisoners. He set a fine example of courage and coolness.
Captain John Forster, Royal Fusiliers. For conspicuous gallantry in action. He led a raid against the enemy's trenches with great courage and skill. Later, he showed great presence of mind under heavy fire, thereby enabling the right flank to advance.
Captain Russell Herbert Freeman, Worcestershire Regiment, and Royal Flying Corps. For conspicuous gallantry in action. He attacked and drove off an enemy aeroplane which had forced one of our machines to land. Later, he landed and rescued the pilot under very difficult conditions. He set a fine example of courage and initiative.
2nd Lieutenant Antonio Marie Gallo, Bedfordshire Regiment, attached Hertfordshire Regiment. For conspicuous gallantry in action. He assumed command of and led his company in the attack with great gallantry, captured his objective, and consolidated the position. Later, he repulsed an enemy attack. He set a fine example throughout.
2nd Lieutenant George Harold Yates Gilbey, Hertfordshire Regiment. For conspicuous gallantry in action. He carried out several daring reconnaissances under fire previous to the attack. Later, he rendered most valuable assistance in assembling the battalion in an extremely difficult area.
Temp 2nd Lieutenant Henry Hastings Goldney, Royal Engineers. For conspicuous gallantry in action. He displayed great courage and skill in marking out assembly positions under very heavy fire, thereby materially assisting in the success of the operations.
Rev. Percy Hallding, Royal Navy, Royal Army Chaplains' Department. For conspicuous gallantry and devotion to duty. He displayed great courage and determination in attending to the wounded under heavy fire. On one occasion he carried a wounded officer from the open into safety.
Temp Captain Frank Anthony Hampton, MB, Royal Army Medical Corps, attached Royal Scots. For conspicuous gallantry and devotion to duty. He continually went out under very heavy fire and remained in the open attending to the wounded with the utmost bravery and coolness. He has previously done fine work.
Temp Sub-Lieutenant Walter Kilroy Harris, Royal Naval Volunteer Reserve. For conspicuous gallantry in action. He led a raid against an enemy machine gun with great gallantry, capturing the gun and turning it on the enemy. Later, he led a small bombing party and was instrumental in capturing 102 prisoners.
2nd Lieutenant Frederick Reginald Hart, Hertfordshire Regiment. For conspicuous gallantry in action. He led his company in the attack with great courage and initiative, and captured his objective. He has previously done fine work. He was severely wounded.
Temp 2nd Lieutenant Arthur Lancelot Holland, Nottinghamshire & Derbyshire Regiment. For conspicuous gallantry in action. He led his company in the attack with great courage and initiative, capturing an enemy battalion commander and his staff. He set a fine example throughout.
Temp 2nd Lieutenant Donald Henry Holley, Royal Engineers. For conspicuous gallantry in action. He showed exceptional courage and resource in consolidating the captured position under heavy fire. He has at all times set a fine example.
2nd Lieutenant Thomas Howarth, Lancashire Fusiliers. For conspicuous gallantry in action. On several occasions he displayed great courage and determination in getting stores up to the front line under heavy fire. He set a splendid example throughout the operations.
Temp Lieutenant Robert Leslie Illingworth, Nottinghamshire & Derbyshire Regiment. For conspicuous gallantry in action. He led his company in the attack with great courage and determination. Later, he, accompanied only by his orderly, captured 81 prisoners.
2nd Lieutenant Herbert Horace Johnson, East Lancashire Regiment. For conspicuous gallantry in action. He carried out a most valuable reconnaissance, thereby enabling his company to reach their objective. On another occasion he led his company in the attack with great courage and determination.
Temp 2nd Lieutenant Raymond Albert Johnson, Nottinghamshire & Derbyshire Regiment. For conspicuous gallantry in action. He led his men in the attack with great courage and determination. He set a splendid example throughout the operations.
2nd Lieutenant John Rodney Johnston, East Surrey Regiment, attached Hertfordshire Regiment. For conspicuous gallantry in action. He entered an enemy dug-out and, single-handed, captured one officer and 45 men. Later, he carried out a daring reconnaissance and obtained most valuable information. He set a fine example throughout.
2nd Lieutenant Herbert Edward Reid Jones, Royal Scots. For conspicuous gallantry in action. He displayed great courage and initiative in the handling of a working party when attacked by a strong party of the enemy. He has previously done fine work.
2nd Lieutenant Colin Keith-Johnston, Bedfordshire Regiment. For conspicuous gallantry in action. He rallied men of several units, led them forward, and captured many prisoners. He continued at duty until relieved, although wounded three times.
Temp Lieutenant William Hubert Kirby, Royal Engineers. For conspicuous gallantry in action. He displayed great courage and determination when constructing a communication trench under heavy fire. Later, he conducted many parties of officers to the assembly points, and by his coolness in these operations materially assisted in the success of the attack.
2nd Lieutenant Clyde Erskine Lanham, Royal Field Artillery. For conspicuous gallantry in action. He displayed great courage and determination when acting as Forward Observation Officer. and repeatedly carried messages through an intense enemy barrage.
Temp Captain John Samuel Levis, MB, Royal Army Medical Corps. For conspicuous gallantry and devotion to duty. He displayed great courage and determination when in charge of stretcher-bearers under heavy fire. He has on many previous occasions done fine work.
Temp Lieutenant John Richard Wardell Linton, Army Service Corps. For conspicuous gallantry in action. When the Siege Artillery Park was being heavily shelled, with great coolness and initiative he organised the working parties to clear the vehicles in the yard and the contents of the workshops to a place of safety.
Temp Captain Francis Cromby Macaulay, MB, Royal Army Medical Corps. For conspicuous gallantry and devotion to duty. He displayed great courage and determination in collecting and attending to wounded under very heavy fire.
Temp Lieutenant James McLaren Marshall, Royal Garrison Artillery. For conspicuous gallantry in action. He rescued and carried a wounded man to safety under very heavy fire. On two other occasions he displayed great courage and devotion to duty by rescuing men under heavy fire.
2nd Lieutenant Charles Sloan McCririck, Royal Highlanders. For conspicuous gallantry in action. He led his men in the attack with great courage and determination, capturing his objective. He was severely wounded.
2nd Lieutenant George Thomas McGill, Royal Scots. For conspicuous gallantry in action. He reorganised a firing line and led it forward again in a second attempt to get through very thick wire. Later, he established and held a line within 50 yards of the enemy's trenches.
Temp 2nd Lieutenant Vincent Matthew McMahon, Royal Dublin Fusiliers. For conspicuous gallantry in action. He led a bombing party against machine guns holding up the advance. He succeeded in knocking out two machine guns and allowed the advance to continue. He was wounded.
Temp 2nd Lieutenant Herbert Marsh Sims Meares, Royal Engineers. For conspicuous gallantry in action. He took command of a section of his company, in addition to his own, and by his example and encouragement kept his men working under very heavy fire.
Temp Sub-Lieutenant Albert Paul Mecklenburg, Royal Naval Volunteer Reserve. For conspicuous gallantry in action. Although twice wounded, he rallied his men close in front of a strongly held enemy position, and, charging right through, broke up all opposition and reached his correct objective.
Lieutenant Frank Melhuish Merson, Honourable Artillery Company. For conspicuous gallantry in action. On two occasions he displayed great courage and skill in fighting his machine guns under very heavy fire. He set a fine example throughout.
Lieutenant John Murray, Royal Highlanders. For conspicuous gallantry in action. He displayed great courage and initiative in reorganising his company under very heavy fire. He previously carried out several valuable reconnaissances under fire.
2nd Lieutenant Frank Naden, Cheshire Regiment. For conspicuous gallantry in action. He reorganised two companies and sent them forward to the final objective, thereby clear-up the situation at a critical time. He set a splendid example of coolness and courage.
Temp 2nd Lieutenant James Eliot Norton, Royal Field Artillery. For conspicuous gallantry in action. He continued to pass the orders to two isolated sections after telephonic communication had been broken down, thereby enabling three guns to be kept in action. On another occasion he kept his battery in action under very heavy fire, and set a fine example to his men.
Temp Lieutenant Clive Edward Effingham Pargeter, Royal Engineers. For conspicuous gallantry in action. He displayed great courage and determination when in charge of a working party under very heavy fire, thereby enabling the task to be completed.
2nd Lieutenant Robert George Parkhurst, Cheshire Regiment. For conspicuous gallantry in action. He collected every available man near him and went forward, clearing the trench and capturing many of the enemy, at the same time joining up with three waves that had been reorganised, taking command and successfully leading them to their final objective.
Temp Lieutenant Cyril Gordon Parsons, Wiltshire Regiment. For conspicuous gallantry in action. He, with a Corporal, went out by daylight and carried out a valuable reconnaissance, thereby enabling an advanced strong point to be established.
Lieutenant Reginald Sherring Partridge, Royal Warwickshire Regiment. For conspicuous gallantry in action. He displayed great courage and initiative when in charge of a raiding party, attacking and dispersing superior numbers of the enemy. He has previously done fine work.
Temp 2nd Lieutenant Ernest Oliver Phillips, Royal West Kent Regiment. For conspicuous gallantry in action. Although wounded he carried out a daring reconnaissance and brought back most valuable information. He has at all times set a splendid example of courage and coolness.
Temp Lieutenant John Frederick Alexander Pitcairn, Royal Naval Volunteer Reserve. For conspicuous gallantry in action. He led a bombing attack with great courage and determination. Later, he held a blocking point against repeated enemy attacks.
Rev. Maurice George Jesser Ponsonby, Royal Army Chaplains' Department. For conspicuous gallantry and devotion to duty. He displayed great courage and determination in attending to the wounded under heavy fire. He undoubtedly saved many lives. He was severely wounded.
Temp 2nd Lieutenant Francis George Preece, Royal Fusiliers. For conspicuous gallantry in action. He displayed great courage and determination in rallying men under heavy fire and in consolidating his position.
Temp 2nd Lieutenant Harry Pritchard, Royal Welsh Fusiliers. For conspicuous gallantry in action. When all his men were wounded he remained with a Sergeant, and held his position. On another occasion he led an offensive patrol and bombed an enemy working party.
Lieutenant Richard Reynolds Rathbone, Liverpool Regiment. For conspicuous gallantry in action. Although wounded, he led a successful raid against the enemy's trenches with great courage and ability. Later, he rescued several wounded men under very heavy fire.
Temp Captain Philip Hugh Rawson, Royal Army Medical Corps, attached South Staffordshire Regiment. For conspicuous gallantry in action. On several occasions he rescued wounded men under very heavy fire. He set a fine example of courage and coolness throughout.
Temp 2nd Lieutenant Francis Patrick Kingston Reynette-James, Royal Engineers. For conspicuous gallantry in action. He displayed great courage and determination in laying a line under very heavy fire, thereby enabling touch to be maintained with the leading battalions. Later, he again laid a line under heavy fire.
Temp Surgeon George Lee Ritchie, MB, attached Royal Naval Division. For conspicuous gallantry and devotion to duty. He displayed great courage and determination in collecting and attending to the wounded under very heavy fire.
2nd Lieutenant William Roche, Royal Field Artillery, attached Heavy Trench Mortar Battery. For conspicuous gallantry in action. Although himself suffering from severe shell shock he dug out a gun which had been buried and got it into action. He set a splendid example of courage and determination throughout. He has previously done fine work.
2nd Lieutenant Robert Cruden Rodger, Royal Field Artillery, attached Trench Mortar Battery. For conspicuous gallantry in action. He showed marked courage and devotion to duty when observing under heavy fire, and was largely responsible for cutting an important section of the enemy's wire. Later, he rendered valuable services by bringing up a trench mortar.
Temp 2nd Lieutenant Reginald Randal Rose, Royal Engineers. For conspicuous gallantry in action. He rallied two companies of infantry and set them to work consolidating their position. Later, he was largely instrumental in capturing twelve prisoners.
Temp Lieutenant Geoffrey Howel Scratton, Argyll & Sutherland Highlanders, attended Royal Highlanders. For conspicuous gallantry in action. He displayed great courage and coolness during the attack. Later, he rendered very valuable assistance during the consolidation of the position under heavy fire.
Captain Arthur Ashton Smalley, MB, Royal Army Medical Corps. For conspicuous gallantry and devotion to duty. He displayed great courage and determination in attending to the wounded, working continuously for 48 hours under heavy fire. He set a fine example throughout.
2nd Lieutenant Eric Butler Smallwood, Hertfordshire Regiment. For conspicuous gallantry in action. When advancing with his machine guns he collected and led a large party of various units to their objective. Later, he took command and handled a company with great courage and skill.
Temp Surgeon Geoffrey Sparrow, MB, attached Royal Naval Division. For conspicuous gallantry and devotion to duty. He displayed great courage and determination in collecting and attending to the wounded under very heavy fire.
2nd Lieutenant Ronald Spicer, Honourable Artillery Company. For conspicuous gallantry in action. He assumed command of and led his company in the attack with great courage and initiative, thereby materially assisting in the success of the operations.
Temp Lieutenant Douglas Wilfrid Stevens, Nottinghamshire & Derbyshire Regiment. For conspicuous gallantry in action. He assisted to reorganise the brigade at a critical time. He set a splendid example of courage and coolness throughout.
Temp 2nd Lieutenant Lawrence Ranford Stott, General List, attached Medium Trench Mortar Battery. For conspicuous gallantry in action. He fought his trench mortar guns with great courage and ability, in spite of heavy odds. He set a splendid example of courage and coolness throughout.
Lieutenant Vivian Home Thomson, Royal Field Artillery. For conspicuous gallantry in action. Although severely wounded, he continued to command his battery with great courage and determination. He has on many previous occasions done fine work.
Temp Sub-Lieutenant Percy Reginald Wait, Royal Naval Volunteer Reserve, attached Machine Gun Company. For conspicuous gallantry in action. He led carrying parties to the front line under intense fire, thereby keeping up a continual supply of ammunition and stores. Later, he rendered valuable assistance by attending to the wounded.
2nd Lieutenant Geoffrey Robert Wallace, Worcestershire Regiment. For conspicuous gallantry in action. He commanded a fighting patrol, with which he successfully raided an enemy trench, killing several of the enemy, and then withdrawing with slight casualties,
2nd Lieutenant Francis Victor Wallington, Royal Field Artillery, attached Trench Mortar Battery. For conspicuous gallantry in action. He displayed great courage and skill during wire-cutting operations in preparation for the attack. Later, he brought a trench mortar forward to an exposed position under heavy fire.
Temp Lieutenant Frank Hewitt Warr, Royal Field Artillery. For conspicuous gallantry in action. When the enemy opened fire with gas shells, he ran through the barrage to warn the men of another section to put their helmets on. On another occasion he displayed great courage and coolness in extricating wounded horses from a wagon under heavy fire.
2nd Lieutenant Henry Robertson Watt, Yorkshire Regiment. For conspicuous gallantry in action. He displayed great courage and determination during a bombing attack on the enemy. Although wounded, he continued to throw bombs until the trench was captured.
Temp Lieutenant Heremon Vandeleur Scott Willcox, Royal Marine Light Infantry. For conspicuous gallantry in action. He fought his trench guns with great courage and determination under very trying conditions. Although wounded, he remained at duty and rendered invaluable Service.
Rev. David Cynddelw Williams, Royal Army Chaplains' Department, attached Royal Welsh Fusiliers. For conspicuous gallantry and devotion to duty. He accompanied the battalion to the front line, and performed most valuable service in the rescue and tending of the wounded under an intense fire. He has on many previous occasions done fine work.
Temp 2nd Lieutenant Belford Alexander Wallis Wilson, Hampshire Regiment. For conspicuous gallantry in action. He led two companies to the front line under very heavy fire with great gallantry. Later, he rendered valuable services in organising and leading supply parties to the front line during a period of three days.
2nd Lieutenant John Melbourne Wrixon, Cambridgeshire Regiment. For conspicuous gallantry in action. He rendered most valuable assistance in getting the men in their assembly positions. Later, he went forward to ascertain the situation and obtained valuable information.
Company Sergeant Major Arthur Bonsall, Cheshire Regiment. For conspicuous gallantry in action. He assumed command of and led his company with great courage and determination, capturing many prisoners. He set a fine example throughout.
Company Sergeant Major Thomas Bowman, Royal Highlanders. For conspicuous gallantry in action. He displayed great courage and determination in rallying and guiding the men of his company towards their objective. He set a splendid example throughout.
Company Sergeant Major James Coe, Cambridgeshire Regiment. For conspicuous gallantry in action. He displayed great courage and ability when in charge of the first wave, and was largely responsible for organising the first objective. Later, with a few men, he reconnoitred the position and captured 70 prisoners.
Battery Sergeant Major Harold William Hines, Royal Field Artillery. For conspicuous gallantry in action. He displayed great courage and determination in getting men and horses away without casualties when under heavy shell fire.
Company Sergeant Major Frederick L. Porton, Royal Fusiliers. For conspicuous gallantry in action. He displayed great courage and initiative in continually assisting his Company Commander to reorganise his company under intense fire. He set a fine example throughout.
Sergeant Major Thomas Edward Proctor Vaughan, Gloucestershire Regiment. For conspicuous gallantry in action. He worked with untiring energy throughout the day, organising supplies for the line, and setting a fine example of devotion to duty under the worst conditions.

Australian Imperial Force
2nd Lieutenant Ernest Francis Armit, Australian Machine Gun Corps. For conspicuous gallantry in action. He assisted the infantry waves from the jumping-off trench, then advanced with his section under intense fire. He set a fine example throughout. He was severely wounded.
2nd Lieutenant William John Dickens, Australian Infantry. For conspicuous gallantry in action. He, with a portion of his company, entered the enemy's trench and held it for 24 hours against several desperate counterattacks. He set a fine example of courage and determination throughout.
Captain John Sylvester Dooley, Australian Infantry. For conspicuous gallantry in action. He handled his company with great courage and initiative. When his trench was subjected to a heavy bombardment he moved his men forward into shell craters, thereby saving many casualties.
Lieutenant Arthur Bruce Durdin, Australian Infantry. For conspicuous gallantry in action. He showed great dash and leadership in organising his defence, and repelled several bombing attacks from both flanks.
Captain John Davie Elder, Australian Infantry. For conspicuous gallantry in action. He showed great courage and good leadership in getting his company into the trench and holding on to it under extremely difficult conditions. He set a splendid example throughout.
2nd Lieutenant Keith Glanfield Emonson, Australian Infantry. For conspicuous gallantry in action. He displayed great courage and determination in directing his men in the defence of his section of the trench against a raiding party of the enemy. He was severely wounded.
Captain Wilmot Fenwick, Australian Medical Corps. For conspicuous gallantry and devotion to duty. He worked continuously for 48 hours under very heavy fire tending and dressing the wounded. He set a splendid example of coolness and courage throughout.
2nd Lieutenant William Frederick Joseph Hamilton, Australian Infantry. For conspicuous gallantry in action. Although wounded he continued to lead his men with great gallantry, and took charge of a bombing attack against very superior numbers of the enemy. He was again wounded.
Lieutenant Oscar Roy Howie, Australian Engineers. For conspicuous gallantry in action. After an enemy mine explosion causing casualties, he organised the rescue parties and led them up to the mine, thereby saving many lives, and performed valuable exploration work underground. He carried out this arduous and dangerous work continually for 24 hours.
Captain James Stanley Malpas, Australian Infantry. For conspicuous gallantry in action. He displayed great resourcefulness and dash in getting his company into an almost impossible position in the trenches. He was severely wounded.
Lieutenant Henry McCloskey, Australian Pioneers. For conspicuous gallantry in action. He led two platoons under very heavy fire on to the ground, where they had to dig a communication trench. Later, although severely wounded, he remained at his post and continued to encourage his men.
Captain William Taylor, Australian Pioneers. For conspicuous gallantry in action. He personally supervised the whole work of his company, which was digging a communication trench in daylight under heavy fire. He set a splendid example throughout.
2nd Lieutenant William Leo Trenerry, Australian Infantry. For conspicuous gallantry in action. He displayed great courage and determination in the handling of his machine guns under heavy fire, and repelled several enemy attacks.

Canadian Forces
Lieutenant Edwin Cowen, Canadian Infantry. For conspicuous gallantry in action. After the explosion of a mine, he took charge of the consolidation of two posts under heavy fire, and was mainly responsible for the repulsing of three enemy attacks.
Lieutenant Angus Archibald McDougall, Princess Patricia's Canadian Light Infantry. For conspicuous gallantry in action. He carried out a dangerous reconnaissance and obtained most valuable information. Later, although very severely wounded, he continued to direct the operations. He has previously done fine work.

Awarded a Bar to the Military Cross (MC*)
Captain John Whitaker Woodhouse, Royal Flying Corps (S.R.)
Captain Percy Emil Julge, Australian Infantry. For conspicuous gallantry in action. He displayed great courage and determination when in charge of a working party who were digging a trench 25 yards from the enemy's front line. He set a splendid example throughout.
2nd Lieutenant Henry William Mends May, Hampshire Regiment. For conspicuous gallantry in action. He organised and led an attack against an enemy strong point which was causing casualties, captured the position together with a machine gun and several prisoners. Later, he reorganised his company under heavy fire, reinforced the front line, and consolidated the captured position.
Temp Lieutenant Robert Albert Plimpton, Argyll & Sutherland Highlanders, attached Royal Highlanders. For conspicuous gallantry in action. He led his men in the attack with great courage and determination, capturing his final objective together with an enemy machine gun and 80 prisoners. Later, in conjunction with another officer, he captured 120 more prisoners.
Temp. Captain Allen Coulter Hancock, Royal Army Medical Corps
Captain George Ambrose Pinney, Royal Field Artillery

Distinguished Conduct Medal (DCM) 
Private F. Abbis, King's Royal Rifle Corps.
Bombardier H. Agar, Royal Field Artillery
Sergeant J. Allanson, Royal Field Artillery 
Regimental Sergeant Major. A. Allison, Dragoon Guards
Sergeant G.O. Anderson, Argyll & Sutherland Highlanders
Acting Company Sergeant Major (Armament Sergeant Major) J. Anderson, North Lancashire Regiment
Sergeant W. Anderson, Royal Warwickshire Regiment
Sergeant T. W. Angel, Rifle Brigade
Sergeant Major S. Armstong, Bedfordshire Regiment
Company Sergeant Major (Acting Sergeant Major) J. J. Atkinson, P.S. attached Durham Light Infantry
Corporal F. W. Attwood, Border Regiment
Private A. Bailey, Royal Sussex Regiment
Corporal J. Bailey, Suffolk Regiment
Company Sergeant Major W. Baker, Royal Warwickshire Regiment
Company Sergeant Major F. Bandy, Northamptonshire Regiment
Company Sergeant Major W. Barbour, Scottish Rifles
Gunner A. Barclay, Royal Field Artillery
Sergeant E. T. Barham, Royal West Surrey Regiment
Company Sergeant Major L. R. Barrett, Gloucestershire Regiment
Sergeant (Acting Staff Sergeant Major) S. G. Bartlett, Army Service Corps, attached Royal Army Medical Corps
Acting Sergeant Major R. A. Baughan, Royal Flying Corps
Sergeant D. R. Baxter, Royal Flying Corps
Sergeant A. Beanland, Nottinghamshire & Derbyshire Regiment
Company Sergeant Major W. Beck, York & Lancaster Regiment
Acting Company Sergeant Major. J. Bell, Yorkshire Light Infantry
Sergeant H. Beniams, Worcestershire Regiment
Sergeant Instructor W. Best, Royal Engineers
Sergeant W. Birchall, South Staffordshire Regiment
Lance Corporal E. J. Bird, Suffolk Regiment, attached Trench Mortar Battery
Sergeant S. S. Bird, Liverpool Regiment
Company Sergeant Major A. Bissett, Cameron Highlanders
Sergeant J. S. Blakey, Lincolnshire Regiment
Farrier Sergeant H. Bliss, Royal Field Artillery
Acting Corporal T. H. Blower, West Yorkshire Regiment
Sergeant (Acting Quartermaster Sergeant) J. D. Boulsbee, Royal Engineers
Company Sergeant Major W. G. Bowditch, London Regiment
Sergeant (Acting Quartermaster Sergeant) A. Bowers, Coldstream Guards
Armament Staff Sergeant F. W. Bowes, Army Ordnance Corps
Sergeant (Acting Sergeant Major) A. W. Bray, Military Mounted Police
Sergeant R. Breathwaite, A.K. Cable Section, attached Signal Company, Royal Engineers
Sergeant E. Brierley, Royal Engineers
Company Sergeant Major A. Briggs, Nottinghamshire & Derbyshire Regiment
Bombardier H. Brindle, Royal Field Artillery
Sergeant J. Brindley, Royal Engineers
Private P. Broadhurst, Shropshire Light Infantry
Battery Sergeant Major (Acting Sergeant Major) E. Broom, Royal Field Artillery
Sergeant P. Brophy, Royal Dublin Fusiliers 
Quartermaster Sergeant E. J. Brown, Hampshire Regiment
Drummer G. L. Brown, Gordon Highlanders
Quartermaster Sergeant T. W. Brown, Grenadier Guards
Private T. W. Brown, Royal Army Medical Corps
Quartermaster Sergeant (Acting Sergeant Major) A. Burgoyne, South Staffordshire Regiment.
Company Sergeant Major F. Burns, Lancashire Fusiliers
Sergeant H. Burns, Scottish Rifles
Acting Lance Sergeant J.C. Bush, Leicestershire Regiment
11420 Sergeant J. Butler, Shropshire Light Infantry
Gunner H. Butterfield, Royal Field Artillery
Sergeant A. E. Callaghan, Gloucestershire Regiment 
Sergeant T. Campbell, Royal Engineers
Sergeant (Acting Staff Sergeant Major) E. Canning, Military Mounted Police 
Gunner J. J. Cantwell, Royal Field Artillery
Company Sergeant Major P. P. Carr, East Yorkshire Regiment
Private E. Carroll, Royal Irish Fusiliers 
Sergeant A. Carter, Royal Fusiliers
Acting Sergeant Major L. E. Carter, Royal Flying Corps
Sergeant J. T. Chape, Army Service Corps
Company Sergeant Major J. Chaplin, South Wales Borderers
Chief Petty Officer W. G. Chapman, Royal Navy
Private A. Charlton, M.T., attached Canadian Divisional Artillery, Army Service Corps
Private M. Charnock, Royal Army Medical Corps 
Corporal A. Chilcott, Royal Scots Fusiliers
Sergeant G.C. Churchett, Machine Gun Corps
Sergeant T. Clark, Machine Gun Corps
Sergeant T. Clark, London Regiment
Sergeant Major. R. G. Coghlan, Durham Light Infantry
Private G. Coles, Dragoon Guards
Gunner E. Coley, Royal Garrison Artillery
Battery Sergeant Major A. Collett, Royal Field Artillery
Company Sergeant Major H. Collins, London Regiment.
Sergeant (Acting Staff Sergeant Major) J. Cooke, Military Mounted Police
Sergeant Drummer R. M. Cooper, Nottinghamshire & Derbyshire Regiment
Sergeant W. J. Corbett, Gloucestershire Regiment
Sergeant W. J. Cossey, East Surrey Regiment
Sergeant A. J. Cottridge, Royal Garrison Artillery
Battery Sergeant Major T. Cotton, Royal Garrison Artillery (attached Heavy Artillery Group)
Sergeant J. T. Cox, Connaught Rangers
Private T. Coyne, York & Lancaster Regiment
Acting Company Sergeant Major S. Craig, Royal Irish Fusiliers 
Sapper P. A. Crofts, Royal Engineers
Acting Corporal J. E. G. Crow, Royal Field Artillery
Acting Sergeant Major T. Cumming, P.S., attached Nottinghamshire & Derbyshire Regiment 
Private H. W. Cunningham, Dorsetshire Regiment
Sergeant J. Curtin, Irish Guards
Battery Quartermaster Sergeant Davison, Royal Field Artillery
Sergeant T.H. Day, Yorkshire Regiment
Sergeant W. Dealtry, Royal Munster Fusiliers
Corporal T. Dean, Royal Engineers
Sergeant J. W. Decker, Machine Gun Corps
Battery Sergeant Major S. J. Denchfield, Royal Field Artillery
Sergeant C. J. Dennett, Royal Engineers
Company Sergeant Major (Drill Sergeant) (Acting Sergeant Major) G. F. Dent, Coldstream Guards
Private A. A. Devey, Royal Army Medical Corps 
Company Sergeant Major C. P. G. Dewson, South Staffordshire Regiment
Lance Corporal T. J. Dinwoodie, Royal Highlanders 
Battery Quartermaster Sergeant W. Doble, Royal Garrison Artillery
Private H. Dower, Royal Fusiliers
Sergeant J. Dowle, Gloucestershire Regiment
Sergeant J. Downing, Yorkshire Regiment
Company Sergeant Major J. H. Driscoll, London Regiment
Sergeant (Acting Company Sergeant Major) C. Duffy, Army Service Corps
Sergeant E. Dugmore, Royal Army Medical Corps
Sergeant W. J. Dunn, Royal Lancaster Regiment
Private D. Dunne, Royal Dublin Fusiliers 
Sergeant H. Edgar, Royal Engineers
Sergeant R. Edwards, Depot, South Wales Borderers
Sergeant W. T. Edwards, South Wales Borderers
Acting Sergeant Major F. Eldridge, Royal Flying Corps
Acting Sergeant R. F. Ellingworth, Royal Engineers
Sergeant Major H. Evans, Royal Naval Division
Sergeant T. Evans, Welsh Regiment
Corporal C. Farrar, West Yorkshire Regiment
Corporal H. Fay, Cheshire Regiment, attached Trench Mortar Battery
Company Sergeant Major F. Fell, Royal Engineers
Company Sergeant Major (Acting Sergeant Major) H. Fenton, West Yorkshire Regiment
Sergeant S. Fenton, Royal Scots
Sergeant-Fitter H. M. Fisher, Royal Field Artillery
Farrier Staff Sergeant W. G. Flatters, Royal Garrison Artillery
Sapper (Acting Sergeant) A. G. Fleet, Royal Engineers 
Company Sergeant Major J. Forbes, Gordon Highlanders
Sergeant T. M. Forrester, Lancashire Fusiliers
Company Sergeant Major R. Forster, Yorkshire Regiment
Corporal R. H. Foster, East Yorkshire Regiment
Company Sergeant Major A. H. Freeborn, Highland Light Infantry
Sergeant W. E. Freeman, Norfolk Regiment
Flight Sergeant H. A. Gamon, Royal Flying Corps
Sergeant. G. Garbutt, Royal Field Artillery
Lance Sergeant F. Gettins, East Kent Regiment
Private A. Gibson, Welsh Regiment
Sergeant J. Gibson, Royal Irish Regiment 
Armament Staff Sergeant D. K. Glass, Army Ordnance Corps, Royal Field Artillery
Corporal H. Godley, Leicestershire Regiment.
Quartermaster Sergeant J. Goloska, Somerset Light Infantry
Corporal. W. Gooderidge, York & Lancaster Regiment
Acting Battery Sergeant Major E. Goodhew, Royal Field Artillery
Lance Corporal (Acting Corporal) J. H. Gordon, Royal Engineers
Sergeant. H. Gowan, Manchester Regiment
Sergeant. J. Grant, Border Regiment
Company Sergeant Major H. T. Gravells, Lincolnshire Regiment
Sergeant A. E. Green, Royal Engineers
Regimental Quartermaster Sergeant W. Green, Hussars
Company Sergeant Major W. B. Green, Manchester Regiment
2nd Corporal (Acting Corporal) T. Greenslade, Royal Engineers
Quartermaster Sergeant T. Gregory, Royal Inniskilling Fusiliers
Company Sergeant Major J. J. Guest, Coldstream Guards
Corporal E. H. Hallows, Royal Field Artillery
Sergeant T. Hamer, East Kent Regiment
Sergeant G. Hands, London Regiment
Sergeant G. Hankinson, Royal Field Artillery
Sergeant J. Harris, Welsh Regiment
Sergeant. G. E. Harrison, King's Royal Rifle Corps 
Sig. Sergeant J. Harrison, King's Own Scottish Borderers
Lance Corporal A. J. Hart, Royal Engineers
Sergeant S. Harvey, Cheshire Regiment
Sergeant W. Harvey, Royal Engineers
Private E. Hastings, Royal Scots
Sergeant J. Hatch, Royal Garrison Artillery
Private E. Hawley, Nottinghamshire & Derbyshire Regiment 
Sergeant R. H. Hayson, Border Regiment
Private L. A. Head, Machine Gun Company
Company Sergeant Major C. F. Hemingway, Yorkshire Light Infantry
2nd Corporal (Acting Corporal) F. Hendrey, Royal Engineers
Sergeant Major W. B. Heycock, Welsh Regiment
Private J. Hill, Nottinghamshire & Derbyshire Regiment
Acting Bombardier W. Hill, Royal Field Artillery
Company Sergeant Major J. Hind, York & Lancaster Regiment
Corporal J. Hine, Royal Garrison Artillery
Sergeant L. Hinton, Liverpool Regiment
Private H. Hobson, Gloucestershire Regiment
Company Sergeant Major A. Hole, West Yorkshire Regiment
Corporal J. Hollingsworth, Rifle Brigade
Corporal G. Holmes, West Yorkshire Regiment
Company Sergeant Major W. Hopkins, Scots Guards
Lance Corporal G. W. Howes, Royal Engineers
Sergeant T. Howley, Royal Munster Fusiliers
Sergeant (Acting Company Sergeant Major) E. Hoyten, Royal Engineers
Sergeant S. Hubbard, Machine Gun Company
Lance Corporal J. Hudson, Worcestershire Regiment (attached Light Trench Mortar Battery)
Company Sergeant Major W. Humphrey, Royal Sussex Regiment
Acting Company Sergeant Major G. W. Humphreys, West Yorkshire Regiment
Private J. F. Hurley, Royal Dublin Fusiliers
Private R. Huskisson, Royal Warwickshire Regiment
Sergeant (Acting Quartermaster Sergeant) J. Huxford, Gloucestershire Regiment
Company Sergeant Major G. Imisson, York & Lancaster Regiment
Company Sergeant Major G. Irvine, Highland Light Infantry
Sergeant A. F. Jackson, Northumberland Fusiliers 
Sergeant W. E. Jackson, Cheshire Regiment
Sergeant E. Jagger, Scottish Rifles
Acting Sergeant H. H. Jakeman, Machine Gun Company 
Lance Corporal (Acting 2nd Corporal) J. James, Royal Engineers 
Sergeant J. Jamieson, Cameron Highlanders
Company Sergeant Major J. Jesse, Machine Gun Company
Private W. Johnson, East Yorkshire Regiment
Sergeant C. Jones, Royal Welch Fusiliers
Colour Sergeant E. Jones, Grenadier Guards
Sergeant G. Jones, East Surrey Regiment
Lance Corporal J. Jones, Manchester Regiment
Acting Sergeant Major J. C. Jones, Royal Flying Corps
Sergeant J. R. Jones, London Regiment
Quartermaster Sergeant R. Jones, Royal Munster Fusiliers
Sergeant W. Jones, Royal Welch Fusiliers
Corporal A. J. Keen, Royal Field Artillery
Sergeant A. J. Kellyn, Royal Engineers
Battery Sergeant Major C. B. Kendal, Royal Field Artillery
Petty Officer J. Kent, Royal Navy
Sergeant. S. Kent, Nottinghamshire & Derbyshire Regiment 
Quartermaster Sergeant E. P. Kerrison, Bedfordshire Regiment
Corporal H.F. Kettle, Shropshire Light Infantry
Sergeant G. King, Royal Inniskilling Fusiliers
Lance Corporal (Acting Sergeant) H. King, Middlesex Regiment
Company Sergeant Major W. H. King, Nottinghamshire & Derbyshire Regiment 
Lance Corporal A. T. Kingston, Royal Engineers
Sergeant T. Kinnaird, Royal Scots
Corporal A. Knight, Royal Engineers
Sergeant Major J. Lacey, Nottinghamshire & Derbyshire Regiment 
Sergeant G. E. Lait, Gloucestershire Regiment
Sergeant C. I. Langeard, Royal Irish Rifles
Sergeant G. Larum, Yorkshire Regiment
Sergeant Major E. Lawrence, Essex Regiment
Corporal S. E. Lawrence, Royal Field Artillery
Private W. Leigh, North Lancashire Regiment
Armament Staff Sergeant (Acting Armament Sergeant Major) W. J. Le Petit, Army Ordnance Corps
Sergeant J. C. Lever, Machine Gun Company
Sergeant. C. H. Lewis, Royal Field Artillery
Company Sergeant Major E. C. Lillystone, Essex Regiment
Company Sergeant Major T. Lines, Cheshire Regiment
Sergeant J. Little, Cameron Highlanders
Company Sergeant Major G. W. Lloyd, Liverpool Regiment
Company Sergeant Major S. H. Lomas, Nottinghamshire & Derbyshire Regiment 
Sergeant F. E. Lumb, West Riding Regiment
Lance Corporal (Acting Sergeant Major) F. Lundy, Military Mounted Police
Sergeant J. Lutman, Machine Gun Corps
Corporal T. F. Lyttle, Royal Army Medical Corps
Sergeant Piper A. Mackenzie, Seaforth Highlanders
Sergeant W. Mackrory, Army Service Corps, attached H.Q. Corps H.A.
Company Sergeant Major J. Magnay, Machine Gun Corps
Lance Corporal (Acting Sergeant) L. Makin, Army Service Corps
Coropral (Lance Sergeant) W. C. Malkowsky, South Staffordshire Regiment
Company Sergeant Major O. Maltby, Yorkshire Light Infantry Special Reserve
Corporal T. Marah, Royal Garrison Artillery
Sergeant W. Marchington, Nottinghamshire & Derbyshire Regiment 
Acting Sergeant Major C. Marley, Royal Flying Corps
Private G. F. Marston, Leicestershire Regiment
Company Sergeant Major W. Mather, Highland Light Infantry
Bombardier G. Matthew, Royal Field Artillery
Company Sergeant Major F. P. Mawditt, Royal West Surrey Regiment
Sergeant J. Maxwell, Gordon Highlanders
Sergeant T. C. Maynard, Royal Garrison Artillery
Sergeant A. McCune, Grenadier Guards
Private W. McDermott, Argyll & Sutherland Highlanders (Special Reserve)
Company Sergeant Major J. McDonald, Yorkshire Regiment 
Sergeant T. McDonald, Royal Irish Regiment
Corporal W. McGovern, Lancashire Fusiliers
Private D. A. Mclntosh, Northumberland Fusiliers 
Company Sergeant Major P. McLachlan, Cameron Highlanders
Quartermaster Sergeant R. G. McVitty, Duke of Cornwall's Light Infantry. 
Lance Corporal R. Metcalf, Yorkshire Light Infantry
Sergeant D. W. Miller, Middlesex Regiment 
Staff Sergeant F J. Milne, Lancers, attached Reserve Regiment of Cavalry
Battery Sergeant Major F. Mitchell, Royal Garrison Artillery
Sergeant J. Mitchell, Royal Highlanders
Sergeant (Acting Company Quartermaster Sergeant) J. Moisley, Army Service Corps, attached Infantry Brigade H.Q.
Company Quartermaster Sergeant (Acting Sergeant Major) W. Moorhouse, Yorkshire Light Infantry, Special Reserve
Private V. Morgan, King Edward's Horse. 
Private J. Morris, Middlesex Regiment
Sergeant S. Morris, Royal Engineers
Battery Quartermaster Sergeant. J. Morrison, Royal Field Artillery
Sergeant F. A. Morrow, Worcestershire Regiment
Sergeant (Acting Sergeant Major) A. G. Moss, Royal Field Artillery
Sergeant J. Murphy, Royal Field Artillery
Sergeant P. Murphy, Royal Welch Fusiliers
Company Sergeant Major J. H. Nash, Royal Warwickshire Regiment
Company Sergeant Major J. Neary, East Lancashire Regiment
Acting Corporal H. Noak, M.T., Army Service Corps
Corporal G. Noakes, Royal Army Medical Corps
Company Sergeant Major (Acting Regimental Sergeant Major) S. C. Nowlan, York & Lancaster Regiment
Sergeant (Acting Company Sergeant Major) P. J. O'Neill, Royal Irish Fusiliers
Sergeant S. O'Neill, Northumberland Fusiliers
Private P. O'Reilly, Royal Irish Rifles
Sergeant J. Ostle, Royal Engineers
Gunner K. H. Oxtoby, Royal Field Artillery
Private F. Padmore, South Staffordshire Regiment
Corporal T. P. Palmer, Royal Garrison Artillery
Private R. Parkes (now Depot), W. Yorkshire Regiment
Sergeant (Acting Battery Quartermaster Sergeant) F. C. Parsons, Royal Field Artillery
Corporal A. Pattie, Lancashire Fusiliers
Acting Bombardier R. G. Pavey, Royal Field Artillery, attached Trench Mortar Battery
Sergeant H. P. J. Peacock, Royal Engineers. 
Sergeant B. J. Peake, Shropshire Light Infantry
Sergeant T. E. Pennington, Manchester Regiment
Quartermaster Sergeant (Foreman of Works) H. S. Pepper, Royal Engineers
Acting Lance Corporal. H. W. Perry, Royal Warwickshire Regiment 
Battery Sergeant Major W. E. Perry, Royal Field Artillery
Sapper R. F. Peters, Royal Engineers
Sergeant E. M. Phillips, Royal Engineers
Gunner T./Bombardier. W. Pike, Royal Marine Artillery
Private O. F. V. Piper, Army Service Corps
Sergeant E. Playle, Royal Field Artillery
Corporal J. Pollendine, Royal Engineers
Private G. Porteous, late South Staffordshire Regiment
Company Sergeant Major J. Porter, King's Royal Rifle Corps
Company Sergeant Major (Acting Sergeant Major) W. Portlock, Gloucestershire Regiment
Sergeant J. Powis, Royal Army Medical Corps
Corporal A. Prankard, South Lancashire Regiment, attached Trench Mortar Battery
Sergeant G. H. Pullen, Royal Engineers
Staff Sergeant Major T. R. Quigley, Royal Engineers
Private G. R. Quinton, Machine Gun Corps (formerly Suffolk Regiment).
Corporal T. Rainford, Royal Field Artillery
Battery Quartermaster Sergeant D. Ramsay, Royal Field Artillery
Company Sergeant Major R. Rankin, Royal West Kent Regiment
Corporal (Acting Company Sergeant Major) P. Ranson, Army Service Corps
Company Sergeant Major A. F. Raven, Norfolk Regiment
Sergeant H. B. Raymond, Royal Field Artillery
Bombardier W. Rayner, Royal Field Artillery
Sergeant Major F. Raynor, West Yorkshire Regiment
2nd Corporal H. Reed, Royal Engineers
Gunner W. Reed, Royal Field Artillery
Sergeant J. Reeves, London Regiment
Corporal S. G. Reeves, Royal Field Artillery, attached Trench Mortar Battery
Sergeant Major H. D. Reid, King Edward's Horse.
Private A. E. Roberts, Manchester Regiment
Gunner E. T. Roberts, Royal Garrison Artillery
Corporal W. Rose, Suffolk Regiment
Sergeant D. Ross, King's Own Scottish Borderers
Sergeant. W. Ross, Depot, Hampshire Regiment
Company Sergeant Major (Acting Sergeant Major) H. Rowbotham, Royal Fusiliers
Squadron Sergeant Major C. Rowland, Lancers
Sergeant L. V. Royall, Coldstream Guards
Private G. Roye, Mounted Military Police
Sergeant W. E. Rudlin, Grenadier Guards, attached Guards Machine Gun Corps
Bombardier G. W. A. Russell, Royal Field Artillery
Staff Sergeant C. Sanders, Royal Army Medical Corps
Company Sergeant Major (Acting Sergeant Major) H. E. Saunders, Royal Fusiliers
Sergeant Major H. Savill, Royal Fusiliers
Corporal (Acting Sergeant) F. G. Sawyer, Royal Sussex Regiment
Acting Battery Sergeant Major A. Sayer, Royal Field Artillery
Company Sergeant Major M. F. Scholes. West Yorkshire Regiment
Battery Quartermaster Sergeant F. Schulen, Royal Field Artillery
Battery Sergeant Major W. A. Searle, Royal Field Artillery
2nd Corporal (Acting Corporal) T. Sendall, Royal Engineers
Sergeant J. Seville, Royal Engineers
Sergeant (Acting Company Quartermaster Sergeant) O T. Sharpe, Lincolnshire Regiment
Corporal A. J. Sheldon, Royal Engineers
Acting Sergeant Major W. C. Shepherd, Highland Light Infantry
Company Quartermaster Sergeant T. Shields, Seaforth Highlanders
Company Sergeant Major J. H. Shirley, King's Royal Rifle Corps
Lance Sergeant A. Schoolbread, Gloucestershire Regiment
Corporal P. A. Shrubsole, Royal Horse Artillery
Sergeant (Acting Company Sergeant Major) F. E. Simmonds, Royal Engineers
Sergeant Major H. Sinclair, Royal Engineers
Corporal H. A. Smith, Royal Field Artillery
Sapper (Acting Lance Corporal) O. F. Smith, Royal Engineers
Sergeant H. Snell, Devonshire Regiment
Private F. Snowdin, Nottinghamshire & Derbyshire Regiment
Company Sergeant Major G. Soanes, Welsh Regiment
Corporal W. Speake, Royal Engineers
Private J. Spencer, Nottinghamshire & Derbyshire Regiment 
Sergeant F. G. J. Spicer, Royal Sussex Regiment
Sergeant A. W. J. Spilsbury, Worcestershire Regiment
Company Sergeant Major J. Stanton, Connaught Rangers
Corporal A. H. Stevens, Machine Gun Corps
Bombardier J. W. Stigger, Royal Field Artillery
Company Sergeant Major V. G. Stocker, A. Cyclist Corps
Gunner F. Stopford, Royal Field Artillery
Company Sergeant Major C. E. Stovin, Royal Irish Rifles
Company Sergeant Major W. Sunderland, West Yorkshire Regiment
Battery Sergeant Major J. Swain, Royal Field Artillery
Corporal A. Swansbury, Leicestershire Regiment
Sergeant Major C. W. Tapson, Royal Army Medical Corps
Lance Corporal (Acting Corporal) F. Taylor, Hampshire Regiment
Sergeant (Acting Company Sergeant Major) G. W. Terry, Royal Engineers
Drummer J. Thomas, Royal Inniskilling Fusiliers
Acting Regimental Sergeant Major A. Thompson, Royal Field Artillery
Sergeant A. J. Thomson, Gordon Highlanders
Sergeant A. Thorn, Royal Engineers
Private G. Thorne, Leicestershire Regiment
Company Sergeant Major A. H. Tilley, Army Service Corps 
Corporal (Acting Sergeant) J. Tillotson, West Riding Regiment
Acting Sergeant I. S. Timmins, Royal Irish Fusiliers
Sergeant H. E. Tobin, Royal Garrison Artillery
Corporal L. Tomes, attached Trench Mortar Battery, Royal Garrison Artillery
Sergeant M. Toohey, Machine Gun Corps
Company Sergeant Major H. J. Toulson, Nottinghamshire & Derbyshire Regiment 
Company Sergeant Major H. F. Tring, South Wales Borderers
Drummer E. G. C. Trussler, Royal Sussex Regiment
Lance Corporal A. E. Tubb, Northumberland Fusiliers
Lance Corporal R. Tull, Royal Lancaster Regiment
Leading Seaman (Higher Grade) S. Turner, Anson Brigade, Royal Naval Division
Private J. T. Urwin, Northumberland Fusiliers
Private E. Vass, Leicestershire Regiment
Sergeant G. Waddington, Scottish Rifles (attached Trench Mortar Battery)
Company Sergeant Major C. Wakeham, Durham Light Infantry
Corporal A. Walker, Nottinghamshire & Derbyshire Regiment
Bombardier B. Walker, Royal Field Artillery
Colour Sergeant J. W. Walsh, Irish Guards, P.S. London Regiment
Sergeant T. Walsh, North Lancashire Regiment (attached Trench Mortar Battery)
Corporal (Acting Sergeant) F. Warr, Royal Engineers
Gunner A. H. Watling, Royal Field Artillery
Sergeant A. Waudby, Rifle Brigade
Lance Corporal G. Webb, East Surrey Regiment
Sergeant (Acting Company Quartermaster Sergeant) W. Webb, Royal Sussex Regiment (attached Machine Gun Company)
Sergeant E. Wedgbury, Worcestershire Regiment
Company Sergeant Major J. Weldon, Northumberland Fusiliers
Corporal E. J. West, King's Royal Rifle Corps
Sergeant R. White, Gordon Highlanders
Private R. G. White, Oxfordshire & Buckinghamshire Light Infantry
Sergeant (Acting Company Sergeant Major) R. P. W. White, Royal Engineers 
Acting Sergeant T.G.O. White, Machine Gun Corps
Sergeant W. White, Royal Army Medical Corps
Quartermaster Sergeant I. H. Whiteing, North Lancashire Regiment 
Company Quartermaster Sergeant G. Wilkins, Royal Scots Fusiliers
Company Sergeant Major E. Williams, Royal Lancaster Regiment
1st Class Staff Sergeant Major G. Williams, Army Service Corps
Sergeant I. Williams, London Regiment
Acting Sergeant J. Williams, Cheshire Regiment
Sergeant J. H. Williams, South Wales Borderers
Corporal (Acting Sergeant) R. J. Williams, Royal Field Artillery
Battery Quartermaster Sergeant J. Williamson, Royal Field Artillery
Corporal H. Wilson, Royal Engineers
Battery Sergeant Major W. Wilson, Royal Field Artillery
Corporal (Acting Company Quartermaster Sergeant) L. W. Witham, Royal Engineers 
Sergeant Major M. H. Wood, Grenadier Guards
Corporal W. Wood, Leicester Regiment
Company Sergeant Major H. Woodhead, Royal Engineers 
Company Quartermaster Sergeant T. E. Woodward, Royal Scots Fusiliers
Sergeant J. H. Wortley, London Regiment
Sergeant G. Wright, Royal Fusiliers
Sergeant (Acting Company Sergeant Major) H. C. Wright, East Kent Regiment
Farrier Quartermaster Sergeant J. Wright, Royal Field Artillery
Battery Sergeant Major P. Wright, Royal Field Artillery

Australian Imperial Force
Corporal J. F. Barrett, Australian Army Medical Corps (attached Australian Infantry)
Sergeant Major A. Bell, Australian Infantry
Sergeant C. V. M. Besanko, Australian Infantry
Corporal E. R. Cavanagh, Australian Infantry
Sergeant R. Cornish, Australian Infantry
Private F. L. Croft, Australian Infantry
Private A. J. Dunn, Australian Infantry
Sergeant J. B. Gordon, Australian Infantry
Sergeant. W. B. Hatton, Australian Infantry
Sergeant G. H. Hirst, Australian Infantry
Gunner Acting Bombardier A. N. Hudson, Australian Field Artillery
Lance Corporal J. F. Kerr, Aust. Machine Gun Company (formerly Australian Infantry)
Staff Sergeant H. King, H.Q., Australian Infantry Brigade
Bombardier J. Lee, Australian Field Artillery
Company Sergeant Major C. E. Loten, Australian Machine Gun Company 
Sergeant A. R. Matthews, Australian Infantry
Lance Sergeant. M. J. McGregor, Australian Infantry
2nd Corporal W. A. McKay, Australian Engineers
Sergeant G. D. McLean, Australian Infantry (attached Australian Light Trench Mortar Battery)
Acting Company Sergeant Major S. Munro, Australian Infantry
Private. H. Murcutt, Machine Gun Company
Sergeant A. H. Nowatna, Australian Infantry
Warrant Officer E. J. O'Neill, Australian Army Service Corps
Corporal A. T. Paul, H.Q., Australian Field Artillery 
Private W. Plunkett, Australian Infantry
Warrant Officer W. B. Robinson, Australian Army Medical Corps
Sergeant A. G. Ross, Australian Infantry
Private F. J. Schenscher, Australian Infantry
Corporal J. Steele, Australian Artillery
Sergeant W. G. Swinton, Australian Infantry
Lance Corporal S. R. Thomas, Australian Infantry
Corporal S. F. Thompson, Australian Field Artillery
Private W. A. Ward, Australian Infantry
Sergeant R. Webb, Machine Gun Company
 Corporal A. White, Australian Infantry (attached Australian Light Trench Mortar Battery)
Sergeant T. W. Whitehead, Australian Engineers 
Company Sergeant Major A. E. Wicks, Australian Infantry
Private P. P. Widdop, Australian Infantry
Company Sergeant Major C. E. Wilkie, Australian Infantry
Corporal G. C. Wilson, Australian Engineers
Corporal E. T. Wood, Australian Field Artillery
Sergeant H. T. Wraight, Australian Infantry
Lance Corporal W. R. Young, Australian Infantry

Canadian Contingent
Sergeant F. Barber. Canadian Mounted Rifles, attached Divisional Signal Company
Sergeant F. H. Bates, Canadian Engineers
Sergeant H. V. A. Bealer, Canadian Infantry
Battery Sergeant Major M. Beards, Canadian Artillery
Corporal (Acting Sergeant) W. J. Bennett, Canadian Infantry 
Lance Corporal. W. Bircham, Canadian Infantry
Sergeant Major J. Bisset, Canadian Army Service Corps
Transport Sergeant W. Blyth, Canadian Infantry
Company Sergeant Major F. Bowles, Canadian Engineers
Lance Corporal L. Bradley, Canadian Army Medical Corps 
Bombardier R. B. Bradley, Canadian Field Artillery
Acting Company Sergeant Major A. Brookes, Canadian Infantry
Private W. M. Brown, Canadian Infantry
Sergeant Major W. H. Buddell, Canadian Infantry
Company Sergeant Major G. Cope, Canadian Infantry
Sergeant F. J. Corcoran, Canadian Engineers
Acting Company Sergeant Major C. F. Dawson, Canadian Infantry 
Quartermaster Sergeant J. Donovan, Canadian Infantry
Lance Corporal J. Ferrier, Canadian Army Service Corps
Sergeant Major W. Fitzgerald, Canadian Infantry
Sergeant W. J. Gerring, Canadian Infantry
Company Sergeant Major F. Gillingham, Princess Patricia's Canadian Light Infantry
Acting Company Sergeant Major F. Gledhill, Canadian Infantry 
Sergeant Major (now temp. Lieutenant) H. C. Good, Canadian Infantry
Sergeant Major A. W. Hawkey, Canadian Mounted Rifles 
Company Sergeant Major. (Acting Regimental Sergeant Major) E.W. Haydon, Canadian Infantry
Acting Lance Corporal W. Hayward, Canadian Mounted Rifles 
Sergeant W. A. Jackson, Machine Gun Corps
Sergeant R. Keillor, Machine Gun Corps
Company Sergeant Major G. W. Kennedy, Canadian Infantry 
Private (Acting Corporal) G. Knox, Canadian Infantry
Company Sergeant Major P. J. S. Laing, Canadian Infantry
Sergeant J. Latham, Canadian Infantry
Signal Sergeant W. H. Lewis, Canadian Infantry 
Sergeant G. E. Levy, Machine Gun Corps
Corporal W. P. Loggie, Canadian Mounted Rifles
Sergeant. W. D. Mackie, Canadian Infantry
Company Sergeant Major J. W. Mansfield, Canadian Engineers
Sergeant A. McClintock, Canadian Infantry
Corporal A. R. Mendizabal, Canadian Artillery 
Gunner (Acting Bombardier) S. W. Morgan, Canadian Artillery (attached Canadian Trench Mortar Battery)
Sergeant G. C. Oliver, Canadian Engineers
Corporal J. D. Paterson, Cyclist Battalion, Canadian Corps 
Company Sergeant Major C. E. B. Rea, Canadian Infantry
Battery Sergeant Major W. B. Rimmer, Canadian Artillery 
Company Sergeant Major R. J. Roberts, Royal Canadian Regiment
Sergeant J. Robinson, Canadian Infantry
Corporal F. Ross, Canadian Infantry
Corporal S. C. Routh, Canadian Artillery
Private B. Sankoske, Canadian Infantry
Corporal F. C. Shoesmith, Canadian Infantry
2nd Corporal J. H. Short, Canadian Engineers
Squadron Quartermaster Sergeant. H. G. Simmons, Canadian Infantry Brigade
Company Sergeant Major H. W. Steel, Canadian Army Service Corps
Sergeant T. Toon, Canadian Engineers
Private G. V. Tuffery, Canadian Mounted Rifles
Sergeant E. Turnbull, Canadian Artillery
Sergeant F. D. Turner, Canadian Engineers
Sergeant Major. F. W. Uden, Canadian Infantry
Company Sergeant Major L. L. Verdon, Canadian Infantry
Quartermaster Sergeant C. A. Walker, Canadian Infantry
Corporal F. A. White, Canadian Infantry
Private G. H. Whiteford, Canadian Infantry (attached Canadian Trench Mortar Battery)
Sergeant. H. A. Whitmore, Canadian Mounted Rifles

South African Contingent
Acting Battery Sergeant Major S. G. Dacombe, Royal Marine Artillery (attached Siege Battery)
Sergeant W. Guest, Royal Marine Artillery, attached Siege Battery, South African Artillery.
Company Quartermaster Sergeant C. H. Ison, South African Engineers.
Sergeant J. W. Meyer, South African Infantry.

New Zealand Force
Corporal A. W. Brown, New Zealand Machine Gun Corps 
Sergeant C. Brown, New Zealand Army Service Corps
Lance Corporal J. P. Egan, Otago Regiment
Sergeant C. Gair, New Zealand Rifle Brigade 
Rifleman R. Marks, New Zealand Rifle Brigade 
Company Sergeant Major E. M. Vicery, New Zealand Engineers

For acts of gallantry and devotion to duty in the Field — 
Sergeant-Piper T. Aitken, Argyll and Sutherland Highlanders. For conspicuous gallantry in action. He has performed consistent good work throughout, and has at all times under fire set a splendid example of coolness and courage.
Corporal J. W. Archer, Cambridgeshire Regiment. For conspicuous gallantry in action. He displayed great courage and skill in establishing and maintaining communications at a critical time. He set a splendid example throughout.
Private T. Archer, Machine Gun Corps. For conspicuous gallantry in action. He took charge of a machine gun and proceeded with it to the enemy's front line trenches. He remained in position for 43 hours until relieved.
Sergeant A. J. Banks, Royal Marine Light Infantry. For conspicuous gallantry in action. He led a bombing party with great courage and determination. He was severely wounded
Corporal H. L. Barington, Hertfordshire Regiment. For conspicuous gallantry in action. He led a bombing party with great gallantry, and rendered valuable assistance in the consolidation of the position. He has at all times set a splendid example.
Sergeant W. J. Bell, Royal Engineers. For conspicuous gallantry in action. He displayed great courage and skill in the preparation of a cable, thereby materially assisting in maintaining communication during the attack.
Acting Corporal H. Board, Royal Field Artillery, attached Trench Mortar Battery. For conspicuous gallantry in action. He fought his trench mortar guns with great courage and determination under very difficult conditions. He has at all times set a fine example.
Company Sergeant Major T. Bolton, Royal Irish Fusiliers. For conspicuous gallantry in action. He has at all times set a fine example of courage and determination.
Private H. J. Brickwood, Cambridgeshire Regiment. For conspicuous gallantry in action. He displayed great courage and determination in collecting and attending to the wounded under very heavy fire. He has previously done fine work.
Sergeant A. E. H. Bright, Royal Fusiliers. For conspicuous gallantry in action. He displayed great courage and determination in blocking and holding up with twelve men an enemy strong point. He set a fine example of coolness and courage.
Petty Officer W. L. Burnett, Royal Naval Volunteer Reserve. For conspicuous gallantry in action. He rallied his men and led them forward with great gallantry, although he had been previously wounded. Later, he remained out all night with a covering party under heavy fire.
Lance Corporal Frank Henry Cammell, East Surrey Regiment. For conspicuous gallantry in action. He led a storming party and cleared 100 yards of the hostile trench, himself killing three of the enemy. He set a splendid example throughout.
Gunner G. Cartwright, Royal Field Artillery, attached Medium Trench Mortar Battery. For conspicuous gallantry in action. He continued to fire his gun in the front line under a very heavy barrage. On another occasion he displayed great courage and coolness in assisting to dig out guns under heavy fire. He has at all times set a fine example.
Company Sergeant Major W. M. Charles, Royal Scots. For conspicuous gallantry in action. He was in the second wave of the attack, and helped the men to get through the enemy wire. He reorganised the men in shell holes close to the enemy's trench, where he was hit several times by bombs, but remained at duty.
Sergeant W. D. Cherry, Worcestershire Regiment. For conspicuous gallantry in action. He assumed command of a half company, and carried out his work under fire with marked courage and skill. He has previously done fine work.
Corporal G. Clark, Royal Field Artillery. For conspicuous gallantry in action. He remained at his post continuously for three days and nights, in order to maintain a complicated system of signal communication. He set a fine example throughout.
Private F. Collier, Cheshire Regiment. For conspicuous gallantry in action. He successfully laid a line under fire enabling communication to be maintained with battalion headquarters, at a critical time. He set a fine example of courage and coolness.
Sergeant E. H. Cooper, Royal Scots. For conspicuous gallantry in action. Although very severely wounded, he rallied some men who were retiring, and got them back to the firing line. He set a splendid example of courage and devotion to duty.
Private Percy George Cornwell, Cambridgeshire Regiment. For conspicuous gallantry in action. He carried a most important message under very heavy fire. He has previously done fine work.
Gunner J. Deane, Royal Field Artillery, attached Medium Trench Mortar Battery. For conspicuous gallantry in action. He rescued a machine gun under very heavy fire, and brought in many wounded men. On another occasion he repeatedly dug out trench mortars which had been buried.
Sergeant J. B. Death, Cambridgeshire Regiment. For conspicuous gallantry in action. He carried out a dangerous reconnaissance, and, later, led his platoon forward with great courage and determination.
Sergeant R. N. Dodds, Royal Engineers. For conspicuous gallantry in action. He organised parties for laying and maintaining telephone cables under very severe fire. He set a splendid example throughout.
Acting Sergeant W. Findlay, Royal Highlanders. For conspicuous gallantry in action. He, with another Sergeant, reorganised some men and attacked an enemy bombing post, driving the enemy out and rescuing a wounded officer who had been captured.
Lance Corporal J. Fraser, Machine Gun Corps. For conspicuous gallantry in action. He, with an officer and one man, took a machine gun forward and successfully broke up an enemy counter-attack. He set a fine example of courage and initiative.
Sergeant E. Freeman, Nottinghamshire & Derbyshire Regiment. For conspicuous gallantry in action. He pushed on rapidly, secured the entrances to the further dug-outs, thereby preventing the escape of the garrison, and was instrumental in the capture of a large number of prisoners.
Private P. Gethins, Royal Highlanders. For conspicuous gallantry in action. On several occasions he carried messages under very heavy fire. He has on all occasions set a splendid example of coolness and courage.
Sergeant J. W. Gladding, Hertfordshire Regiment. For conspicuous gallantry in action. He led his platoon with great gallantry, and himself accounted for many of the enemy. He set a splendid example throughout.
Private J. Gray, Hertfordshire Regiment. For conspicuous gallantry in action. He displayed great courage and initiative when in charge of fourteen enemy prisoners who endeavoured to escape, and finally brought them back to battalion headquarters.
Company Sergeant Major G. S. Gregory, Hertfordshire Regiment. For conspicuous gallantry in action. He arranged the water and ration supplies, and materially assisted in the evacuation of the wounded. He set a splendid example of courage and coolness throughout.
Sergeant E. L. Hall, Cheshire Regiment. For conspicuous gallantry in action. He led his men to the first objective with great gallantry. Later, although wounded, he continued to lead his men until exhausted.
Acting Corporal W. Hibbert, Hertfordshire Regiment. For conspicuous gallantry in action. He displayed great courage and determination in holding an advanced bombing post against very superior numbers of the enemy.
Private J. H. Hobbs, Hertfordshire Regiment. For conspicuous gallantry in action. Although twice wounded he continued to go forward displaying great courage and determination. He was again wounded.
Private H. Howard, Cambridgeshire Regiment. For conspicuous gallantry in action. With a few men he rushed an enemy machine gun, captured the gun and several prisoners. He set a fine example of coolness and courage
Private W. James, East Surrey Regiment. For conspicuous gallantry in action. On several occasions he carried messages under very heavy fire, and led forward men who had lost their leaders. He set a splendid example of courage and coolness throughout.
Sergeant A. H. Jones, Worcestershire Regiment. For conspicuous gallantry in action. He led the left group of a fighting patrol which successfully raided an enemy trench. He has previously done fine work.
Sergeant J. W. Jordan, Cambridgeshire Regiment. For conspicuous gallantry in action. He led his half company forward and organised the position with great courage and skill. He has at all times set a fine example.
Private C. Kerr, Royal Scots. For conspicuous gallantry in action. He, with another man, displayed great courage and initiative in retaking a trench and inflicted considerable loss on the enemy.
Sergeant J. W. Kimberley, Royal Warwickshire Regiment. For conspicuous gallantry in action. With a few men he held an exposed post for two days and nights against very superior numbers of the enemy. He set a splendid example throughout.
Private J. Loftus, Cheshire Regiment. For conspicuous gallantry in action. He took charge of a party and led them down an enemy trench, bombing, and clearing the dug-outs. He set a splendid example, throughout.
Sergeant G. Y. Macfarlane, Royal Highlanders. For conspicuous gallantry in action. He, with another Sergeant, reorganised some men and attacked an enemy bombing post, driving the enemy out and rescuing a wounded officer who had been captured. Later, although himself wounded, he continued to remain at his post.
Sergeant W. J. Marshall, Royal Field Artillery. For conspicuous gallantry in action. When his battery was heavily shelled he displayed great courage and determination in handling and encouraging his men. He has at all times set a fine example.
Sergeant A. B. Matthew, Gordon Highlanders. For conspicuous gallantry in action. On. two occasions he displayed great courage and determination on patrol, and obtained most valuable information. He has on many occasions done fine work
Corporal W. McNally, South Lancashire Regiment. For conspicuous gallantry in action. He-assumed command of his company and consolidated the position won. Later, he withdrew his men with great skill to a strong point in advance of the front line.
Private M. McSkimming, Royal Scots. For conspicuous gallantry in action. He, with another man, displayed great courage and initiative in retaking a trench and inflicted considerable loss on the enemy.
Lance Corporal J. Murphy, York and Lancaster Regiment. For conspicuous gallantry in action. He-rendered invaluable assistance in getting and torpedo into position under the enemy's wire, and although severely wounded continued at his work.
Private T. Myles, Royal Highlanders. For conspicuous gallantry in action. On-several occasions he carried messages under-very heavy fire. He has at all times set a splendid example of coolness and courage.
Sergeant W. H. Nash, Gloucestershire Regiment. For conspicuous gallantry in action. He displayed great courage and initiative in-leading an attack against the enemy. Later, he rendered most valuable assistance in the captured line.
Lance Sergeant G. E. Partridge, North Lancashire Regiment. For conspicuous gallantry in action. He-led his men in the attack with great courage and determination. Later, he carried out a dangerous patrol in daylight. He set a fine example throughout.
Private H. Pugh, Gloucestershire Regiment. For conspicuous gallantry in action. He led a party with great gallantry against an enemy machine gun, and himself shot three of the gun team. He has previously done-fine work.
Lance Corporal C. S. Quinn, Depot, Bedfordshire Regiment. For conspicuous gallantry in action. He rallied his platoon, and in the face of heavy fire from an enemy strong point at close range he continued to encourage his men after having been severely wounded.
Lance Corporal R. Read, South Lancashire Regiment. For conspicuous gallantry in action. He repeatedly carried messages over the open under heavy fire. Later, he rendered most valuable services in collecting and in consolidating the position.
Private A. Shaw, Machine Gun Corps. For conspicuous gallantry in action. He, with an officer and a N.C.O. took a machine gun forward, and successfully broke up an enemy counter-attack. He set a fine example of courage and initiative.
Sergeant J. Slater, Royal Scots. For conspicuous gallantry in action. He displayed great courage and determination when in charge of a party of bombers, who drove the enemy out of a trench and recaptured a machine gun. Later, he carried out a valuable reconnaissance.
Private A. W. Spencer, Gloucestershire Regiment. For conspicuous gallantly in action. He took out a machine gun in front of the newly captured line to enfilade the enemy's position and maintained his position. He set a fine example of coolness and courage.
Sergeant G. Stewart, Royal Field Artillery. For conspicuous gallantry in action. He displayed great courage and initiative in leading several, wagons to a place of safety under heavy fire, undoubtedly saving many casualties. On another occasion he rendered valuable assistance in rescuing three buried men.
Acting Sergeant S. A. Stych, Nottinghamshire & Derbyshire Regiment. For conspicuous gallantry in action. Having cleared his part of the enemy trench, he led his platoon against a party of the enemy who were sniping from dug-outs. He bombed them into their dug-outs and guarded the entrances, thereby greatly assisting in the capture of 150 prisoners.
Company Sergeant Major W. Templeton, Cameron Highlanders. For conspicuous gallantry in action. He collected a party of men, and by his initiative was able to hold up the enemy's advance, rendering most valuable service at a critical period.
Company Sergeant Major George Theedom, East Surrey Regiment. For conspicuous gallantry in action. He displayed great courage and initiative when in charge of carrying parties under heavy fire. He was wounded.
Sergeant R. B. Trotter, Royal Army Medical Corps. For conspicuous gallantry and devotion to duty. He displayed great courage and determination when in charge of a number of stretcher-bearer squads. On several occasions he personally tended the wounded under very heavy fire.
Gunner H. D. Ward, Royal Field Artillery, attached Trench Mortar Battery. For conspicuous gallantry in action. He displayed great courage and rendered most valuable services throughout the operations. On one occasion he went out and carried back many wounded men.
Corporal H. Waterton, Hertfordshire Regiment. For conspicuous gallantry in action. He displayed great courage and skill in handling his machine guns under heavy fire, and greatly assisted in repulsing several hostile attacks.
Private G. Watson, Northumberland Fusiliers. For conspicuous gallantry in action. He laid a cable under heavy fire, displaying great courage and determination. He has previously done fine work.
Private A. W. Wayman, Cambridgeshire Regiment. For conspicuous gallantry in action. He carried a most important message under very heavy fire. He has previously done fine work.
Acting Sergeant W. Webster, Royal Highlanders. For conspicuous gallantry in action. He displayed great courage and determination in entering an enemy dug-out and taking one officer and 20 men prisoners. Later, he commanded the right half of his company with great skill
Private Harold Whowell, North Lancashire Regiment. For conspicuous gallantry-in action. On several occasions he attended wounded men under very heavy fire. He set a fine example of courage and coolness throughout.
Corporal G. A. Willey, Hertfordshire Regiment. For conspicuous gallantry in action. He showed marked courage when clearing enemy dug-outs, and himself accounted for several of the enemy. He has at all times set a fine example.
Corporal D. Wilson, Argyll & Sutherland Highlanders. For conspicuous gallantry in action. He carried out some very difficult reconnaissance work under continuous hostile fire, setting a fine example of fearlessness and courage.
Private F. Wright, North Lancashire Regiment. For conspicuous gallantry in action. In spite of resistance he, single-handed, captured 20 of the enemy, including an officer, and brought them back to battalion headquarters.

Australian Imperial Force
Temp Sergeant P. D. Jones, Australian Infantry. For conspicuous gallantry in action. He single-handed attacked and killed three of the enemy. Later, he displayed great courage and initiative in assisting to lead his company to the second objective. He set a splendid example throughout.

Awarded a Bar to the Distinguished Conduct Medal (DCM*) 
Corporal W. Hay, Northumberland Fusiliers. For conspicuous gallantry in action. He worked continuously for seven days under intense fire repairing a most important telephone wire which was repeatedly being cut. He has on many previous occasions done fine work.

Meritorious Service Medal (MSM) 
 Staff Sergeant (Acting Staff Sergeant Major) W. J. Adcock, Army Service Corps
Company Sergeant Major F. H. Alder, King's Royal Rifle Corps.
Corporal J. E. Aldridge, Royal Army Medical Corps.
Staff Sergeant Major A. Allen, Army Service Corps
Private R. Allen, Dragoon Guards
Corporal (Acting Staff Quartermaster Sergeant) S. Allen, Army Service Corps
Staff Sergeant H. B. Alloway, Royal Army Medical Corps
Staff Sergeant Major (Acting 1st Class Staff Sergeant Major) P. Andress, Army Service Corps
Quartermaster Sergeant A. W. Andrews, Middlesex Regiment
Company Sergeant Major (Acting Sergeant Major) G. F. Archibald, Royal Scots attached Entrenching Battalion
Staff Sergeant Major E. Arnold, Army Service Corps
Staff Quartermaster Sergeant (Acting Staff Sergeant Major) C. H. Atkins, Army Service Corps
Corporal (Acting Sergeant Major) A. Avery, Shropshire Light Infantry, attached Entrenching Battalion
Company Sergeant Major F. J. D. Ayres, Machine Gun Corps
Quartermaster Sergeant (Artillery Clerk) (Acting Battery Sergeant Major) J. A. Barkham, Royal Artillery
Mechanist Staff Sergeant (Acting Mechanist Sergeant Major) G. Bass, Army Service Corps
Lance Corporal (Acting Sergeant) H. J. Bate, Army Service Corps 
Staff Quartermaster Sergeant. A. V. Baxter, Army Service Corps
2nd Corporal D. Baxter, Royal Engineers
Private H. G. Beatton, Royal Army Medical Corps
Private T. R. Begley, Royal Army Medical Corps
Sergeant A. W. Bendall, Royal Engineers
Private J. M. Bennett, West Riding Regiment
Private T. Bentley, Royal Munster Fusiliers
Lance Corporal E. Bibby, Dragoon Guards, attached Military Mounted Police
Sergeant G. H. Bicknell, Royal Flying Corps
Corporal S. Billyeald, Dragoon Guards
Sergeant Major G. H. Bishop, Rifle Brigade, attached Egyptian Army.
Battery Sergeant Major G. W. Blackman, Royal Field Artillery
Lance Corporal W. Boddington, London Regiment
Quartermaster Sergeant E. W. Bond, Coldstream Guards
Foreman of Works Staff Sergeant A. E. Bone, Royal Engineers
Quartermaster Sergeant (Acting Sergeant Major) B. Booth, Royal Irish Rifles, attached G.H.Q.
Private (Acting Corporal) H. R. Bower, Army Service Corps
Engineer Colour-Sergeant T. W. Bowes, Royal Engineers
Private (Lance Corporal) W. H. Boyd, Military Mounted Police 
Private A. Bradley, Army Ordnance Corps
Sergeant Major L. J. Brain, Royal Army Medical Corps
Corporal F. A. W. Braine, Royal Flying Corps
Battery Sergeant Major W. T. Brierly, Royal Field Artillery
Superintending Clerk W. P. Britton, Royal Engineers
Sergeant J. T. Brown, Devon Regiment
Sergeant W. G. Brown, Seaforth Highlanders
Sergeant W. H. Brown, Royal Engineers
Acting Company Sergeant Major Instructor V. Bullen, Gymnastic Staff
Staff Sergeant Major A. V. Burd, Army Service Corps
Armament Staff Sergeant (Acting Armament Sergeant Major) W. Burden, Army Ordnance Corps
Sergeant (Acting Company Sergeant Major) A. E. Burfitt, Royal Engineers
Company Sergeant Major H. J. Burridge, Royal Engineers
2nd Corporal (Acting Sergeant Engineer Clerk.) A. T. Burt, Royal Engineers
Company Sergeant Major F.J. Burton, Army Service Corps
Engineer Clerk Quartermaster Sergeant (Acting Superintending Clerk) H. Butler, Royal Engineers
Company Sergeant Major J. W. Byatt, Royal Engineers
Armament Sergeant Major J. Byrom, Army Ordnance Corps
Sergeant M. Cairns, Coldstream Guards
Private (Acting Corporal) W. G. Callander, Army Service Corps
321 Quartermaster Sergeant (local rank Sergeant Major) J. Campbell, Irish Guards, attached Egyptian Army
1st Class Staff Sergeant Major A. J. Carey, Army Service Corps
1st Class. Staff Sergeant Major J. W. Carr, Army Service Corps
Company Sergeant Major. T. Cash, Manchester Regiment
Sergeant R. Catley, Hampshire Regiment
Battery Sergeant Major C. Canter, G. Battery, Royal Horse Artillery 
Staff Sergeant (Acting Sergeant Major) H. L. Chavasse, Army Veterinary Corps
Air Mechanic 1st Class E. E. Childs, Royal Flying Corps
Sergeant Major (Artillery Clerk) P. W. Clarke, Royal Artillery
Sergeant Major (Acting Superintending Clerk) J. W. E. Clemons, Royal Engineers
Battery Sergeant Major H. J. Coates, Royal Field Artillery
Private (Acting Sergeant) C. Cole, Army Veterinary Corps
Staff Sergeant H. W. Cole, Ary Service Corps
Corporal (Acting Sergeant) J. Cole, Royal Engineers
Farrier Corporal (Acting Farrier Sergeant) B. H. Collett, Army Service Corps
Superintending Clerk A. Collie, G.H.Q., Royal Engineers
Staff Sergeant Farrier T. C. Collins, Royal Horse Artillery
Sapper (Acting 2nd Corporal) R. M. Connell, Royal Engineers Special Reserve
Superindending Clerk F. Cook, Royal Marines
Quartermaster Sergeant (Acting Superintending Clerk) J. Cook, Scots Guards, attached G.H.Q.
Sergeant J. C. Cooper, Royal Flying Corps
Sergeant J. L. Copland, Royal Engineers
Quartermaster Sergeant W. H. Corbett, Coldstream Guards
Corporal (Acting Company Quartermaster Sergeant) S. Coulson, Army Service Corps
Battery Sergeant Major H. S. Cowland, Royal Field Artillery
Driver (acting Corporal) E. V. Cox, Army Service Corps 
Battery Sergeant Major J. Crawford, Royal Garrison Artillery
Private W. L. Crocker, Devon Regiment
Acting Lance Corporal G. Crow, Middlesex Regiment
Battery Sergeant Major F. C. Curtis, Royal Field Artillery
Private (Acting Lance Corporal) W. J. Daires, Army Service Corps
Corporal (Acting Sergeant) W. R. Dandy, Royal Flying Corps. 
Engineer Clerk Quartermaster Sergeant F. G. L. Davey, Royal Engineers
Mechanist Sergeant Major G. Dawson, Army Service Corps
Staff Sergeant Major (Acting 1st Class Staff Sergeant Major) W. H. Dean, Army Service Corps
Sergeant Major (Artillery Clerk) S. H. Dexter, Royal Garrison Artillery
Staff Sergeant Major W. Dible, Army Service Corps
Driver J. Draper, Army Service Corps
Private (Acting Sergeant) G. Dunlop, Royal Army Medical Corps 
Flight Sergeant C. W. Durman, Royal Flying Corps
Engineering Ledger Keeper and Storeman Quartermaster Sergeant A. M. Durrant, Royal Engineers
Lance Corporal (Acting 2nd Corporal) N. A. Eaton, Royal Engineers
Superintending Clerk J. Edington, Royal Engineers
Battery Quartermaster Sergeant G. R. Edmondson, Royal Field Artillery
Staff Sergeant (Acting Staff Quartermaster Sergeant) G. T. Elliott, Army Service Corps
Mechanist Staff Sergeant S. Elliott, Supply Column, Army Service Corps
Sergeant W. C. Elliott, Army Service Corps
2nd Corporal (Acting Company Sergeant Major) C. J. R. Elms, Royal Engineers
Private (Acting Sergeant) A. Emerson, Army Service Corps 
Sergeant T. W. Emmerson, Army Veterinary Corps
Private (Acting Corporal) W. Evans, Royal Army Medical Corps 
Quartermaster Sergeant P. H. Faulkner, London Regiment
Quartermaster Sergeant W. Fawcett, Grenadier Guards
Sub-Conductor (Acting Conductor) S. A. Fenn, Army Ordnance Corps
Sergeant (Acting Staff Sergeant) G. W. Feurer, Army Pay Corps
Sergeant (Acting Staff Quartermaster Sergeant) E. W. H. Fillmore, Army Service Corps
Sergeant R. H. G. Filtness, Army Service Corps
Quartermaster Sergeant (local Sergeant Major) G. Fitzgerald, North Staffordshire Regiment, attached Egyptian Army
Colour Sergeant R. S. Flint, King's Royal Rifle Corps
Staff Sergeant C. D. Fowles, Army Service Corps
Sergeant (Acting Sergeant Major) E. Fowles, Royal Flying Corps
Sergeant Major (Artillery Clerk) J. B. Fox, Royal Artillery
Engineering Clerk Quartermaster Sergeant H. B. J. Franklin, Royal Engineers
Staff Quartermaster Sergeant W. J. Franks, Army Service Corps
Engineering Clerk Sergeant C. Freshwater, Royal Engineer
Sergeant (Acting Staff Sergeant) G. E. Gaches, Army Service Corps
Lance Corporal P. Gaines, Northumberland Fusiliers
Company Quartermaster Sergeant H. Gales, Middlesex Regiment
Company Sergeant Major C. Gilbert, Royal Engineers
Regimental Corporal Major W. Glading, Royal Horse Guards
Staff Sergeant C. Goldsmark, Royal Army Medical Corps
Sergeant (Acting Company Sergeant Major) J. H. Goldie, Scots Rifles
Lance Sergeant (Acting Sergeant Major) J. H. Graham, Grenadier Guards, attached Entrenching Battalion
Sergeant N. Green, York & Lancaster Regiment
Staff Sergeant Major A. Greenwood, Army Pay Corps
Sergeant J. C. Grigg, Army Service Corps
Sergeant (Acting Mechanist Staff Sergeant) W. Hales, Army Service Corps
Staff Sergeant Major (Acting Staff Sergeant Major) G. Harrison, Army Service Corps
Battery Sergeant Major F. Hatch, Royal Field Artillery
Sergeant W. W. Hatfield, Army Service Corps
Sergeant (Acting Sergeant Major) W. C. Hayward, Royal Flying Corps
Trooper (Acting Lance Corporal) J. Heeley, King Edward's Horse.
Staff Sergeant Major (Acting 1st Class Staff Sergeant Major) S. Hellier, Army Service Corps
Sergeant H. A. Hemming, Royal Flying Corps
Sergeant (Artillery Clerk) A. O. Hemus, Royal Artillery
Corporal E. E. J. Hennessy, Army Service Corps
Lance Corporal W. Herbert, Hampshire Regiment
Sergeant Major N. Herdman, Seaforth Highlanders 
Private (Acting Staff Sergeant) J. E. Hickman, Army Service Corps
Sergeant Major F. Hill, Hussars
Engineer Ledgerkeeper & Staff Quartermaster Sergeant. A. C. Hills, Royal Engineers
Sergeant (Acting Regimental Quartermaster Sergeant) A. Hobbs, R.D. 
Sergeant W. Holden, Hussars
Staff Quartermaster Sergeant M. Holywood, Army Service Corps
Sub-Conductor (Acting Conductor) N. Honey, Army Ordnance Corps
Lance Corporal J. Hood, Kings Royal Rifle Corps
Flight Sergeant H. I. Hooper, Royal Flying Corps
Lance Corporal (Acting Sergeant) H. J. Horner, Royal Engineers
Air Mechanic T. Horton, Royal Flying Corps
Flight Sergeant C. J. Howard, Royal Flying Corps
Lance Sergeant G. W. Howell, Roya Welch Fusiliers, attached Entrenching Battalion
Company Sergeant Major A. Hudson, Welsh Regiment
Sergeant (Acting Staff Sewgeant) E. A. Hughes, Army Service Corps
Staff Sergeant Major (Acting Ist Class Staff Sergeant Major) P. Hulbert, Army Service Corps
Quartermaster Sergeant J. Humphreys, Royal Engineers
Staff Sergeant. (Acting Sergeant Major) T. H. Hunt, Military Provost Staff Corps.
Company Sergeant Major (Acting Quartermaster Sergeant) M. S. Hunter, Postal Section, Royal Engineers, Special Reserve
Company Sergeant Major (Acting Sergeant Major) E. Hurvid, Devonshire Regiment, attached Entrenching Battalion
Staff Sergeant Major (Acting Regimental Sergeant Major) T. Hyett, Dragoon Guards, P.S., Northamptonshire Yeomanry
Corporal G. S. Iddison, Royal Army Medical Corps
Lance Corporal H. Inglis, Gordon Highlanders
Acting Sergeant W. L. Inglis, Cameron Highlanders
Sergeant (Acting Staff Sergeant Major) A. F. Jamieson, Army Service Corps
Private J. Jervis, Army Service Corps
Engineer Ledgerkeeper and Quartermaster Sergeant H. J. Jones, Royal Engineers
Armourer Staff Sergeant W. Joines, Army Ordnance Corps, attached Egyptian Army.
Acting Lance Corporal T. Keeley, Manchester Regiment
1st Class Staff Sergeant Major M. Keenan, Army Service Corps
Company Sergeant Major (Acting Sergeant Major) J. T. Keene, Rifle Brigade
Company Sergeant Major H. Kendall, Army Service Corps. 
Sergeant (Acting Staff Sergeant Major) J. Keyes, Army Service Corps
Sergeant G. Kindness, Royal Engineers
Private F. King, Hampshire Regiment
Staff Sergeant (Acting Staff Sergeant Major) H. J. Knight, Army Service Corps
Acting Company Sergeant Major Instructor A. G. Lammas, Army Gym Staff
Military Mechanist Acting Staff Sergeant H. W. Lane, Royal Engineers
Corporal (Acting Staff Sergeant) H. T. Langstone, Army Service Corps
Sergeant (Acting Sergeant Major) C. T. Layland, Royal Scots, attached Entrenching Battalion
1st Class Staff Sergeant Major E. J. Le Blancq, Army Service Corps
Engineer Sergeant Quartermaster Sergeant W. E. Ledden, Royal Engineers
Armament Staff Sergeant (Acting Armament Sergeant Major) W. J. Le Petit, Army Ordnance Corps
Staff Quartermaster Sergeant H. C. Lester, Army Service Corps
Quartermaster Sergeant (Acting Sergeant Major) F. W. Leverett, Royal Fusiliers, attached Machine Gun Section
Sergeant (Acting Staff Sergeant) F. C. Lisle, Army Service Corps
Armament Staff Sergeant (Acting Armament Sergeant Major) G. Littleton, Army Ordnance Corps
Lance Corporal E. H. Longshaw, Royal Engineers
Private (Acting Lance Corporal) F. H. Ludlow, Royal Army Medical Corps
Lance Corporal F. MacFarlane, Royal Highlanders, attached Royal Engineers
Farrier Quartermaster Corporal J. K. Mackenzie, Life Guards
Conductor A. C. W. Maile, Army Ordnance Corps
Company Quartermaster Sergeant. H. E. Mallows, Royal Engineers
Armament Staff Sergeant L. E. Markey, Army Ordnance Corps, attached Royal Field Artillery
Conductor A. W. Martin, Army Ordnance Corps
Lance Corporal (Acting Corporal) O. Martin, Royal Engineers, Special Reserve
Acting Company Sergeant Major (Artillery Clerk) E. P. Mason, Royal Garrison Artillery
Company Quartermaster Sergeant W. W. Mathie, Army Service Corps
Squadron Quartermaster Sergeant B. J. S. McFie, Q.O., Oxfordshire Hussars Yeomanry
Private J. Mclnnes, Cameron Highlanders
Corporal J. McMorran, Royal Scots
Staff Quartermaster Sergeant. F. McNicoll, Army Pay Corps
Battery Sergeant Major T. McVeigh, Motor Machine Gun Service. 
Private E. J. Meiklejohn, Royal Army Medical Corps
Engineer Clerk Quartermaster Sergeant F. T. Merrick, Royal Engineers
Quartermaster Sergeant (Acting Sergeant Major) (Armourers Crew) T. Metherell, Royal Artillery, Clerks Section.
Acting Sergeant Major L. H. Metz, Royal Flying Corps
Farrier Sergeant C. G. Miller, Riyak Field Artillery
Engineer Clerk Sergeant (Acting Engineer Clerk Quartermaster Sergeant) P. E. C. Miller, Royal Engineers
Company Sergeant Major L. S. Mirame, Army Service Corps
Staff Quartermaster Sergeant A. E. Mirfie, Army Service Corps 
Private (Acting Sergeant) T. Mitchinson, Army Service Corps
Company Quartermaster Sergeant, now Quartermaster Sergeant (Orderly Room Sergeant) J. C. Moon, Royal Warwickshire Regiment
Corporal P. S. Moore, South Wales Borderers
Military Mechanical and Electrical Sergeant Major W. M. N. Morecombe, Royal Engineers
Fitter J. F. Morris, Royal Field Artillery
Sergeant (Acting Company Sergeant Major) H. J. H. Moses, Royal Engineers
Lance Sergeant E. Moss, Royal Army Medical Corps
Gunner F. T. Moulton, Royak Garrison Artillery
Sub Conductor. A. J. Muir, Army Ordnance Corps, attached Egyptian Army.
Acting Sergeant Major 0. Mullen, Royal Flying Corps
Corporal (Acting Sergeant) M. Mullen, Army Service Corps
Quartermaster Sergeant D. A. Murray, East Lancashire Regiment
Lance Corporal J. Murray, Army Service Corps
Corporal E. E. Nash, Grenadier Guards, attached Guards Divisional Signal Company
Company Sergeant Major J. E. B. Nealon, Royal Engineers
Quartermaster Sergeant (Acting Sergeant Major) J. E. Newton, Royal Army Medical Corps
Corporal E. Norton, Army Service Corps
7685 Drill Sergeant (Acting Sergeant Major) F. Oakley, Grenadier Guards, attached Entrenching Battalion
Sergeant. P. O'Brien, Royal Engineers
Staff Sergeant (Acting Staff Sergeant Major) R. O'Brien, Army Service Corps
Foreman of Works Quartermaster Sergeant J. W. O'Hanlon, Royal Engineers
Farrier Quartermaster Sergeant A. E. Oliver, Hussars
Staff Sergeant J. J. O'Shea, Army Service Corps
Sub-Conductor (Acting Conductor) A. Osman, Army Ordnance Corps
Private (Acting Sergeant) F. H. Padfield, Army Service Corps
Driver (Acting Corporal) T. E. Page, Army Service Corps
Regimental Sergeant Major J. Parkin, Yorksshire Hussars Yeomanry
Acting Sergeant Major W. T. Payton, Rifle Brigade, attached London Regiment
Armament Sergeant Major W. R. O. Pearce, Armuy Ordnace Corps
Quartermaster Sergeant (Acting Staff Sergeant Major) E. Pearson, Worcestershire Regiment, attached G.H.Q
Staff Sergeant (Acting Sergeant Major) W. C. Pepperell, Army Veterinary Corps
Sergeant W. T. Perkins, Royal Army Medical Corps
Sergeant J. Pickering, Manchester Regiment
Company Sergeant Major S. Pickering, Postal Service, Royal Engineers 
Ist Class Staff Sergeant Major F. Pilkington, Army Service Corps attached G.H.Q. 
Quartermaster Sergeant. C. H. Pithers, York & Lancaster Regiment
Sergeant R. Pollock, Royal Army Medical Corps 
Staff Sergeant (Acting Staff Sergeant Major) W. J. Pope, Army Service Corps
Quartermaster Sergeant (Acting Superintending Clerk) W. W. Popperwell, Royal Engineers
Corporal (Acting Sergeant) E. Poulton, Royal Engineers
Staff Sergeant H. M. Prince, Royal Army Medical Corps
Sergeant (Acting Staff Sergeant Major) C. Prince-Cox, Army Service Corps
Sergeant C. W. Purchase, London Regiment
Staff Sergeant Major R. Rands, Army Service Corps
1st Class Staff Sergeant Major W. J. Ranson, Army Service Corps
Lance Corporal (Acting 2nd Corporal) C. Redley, Royal Engineers
Company Quartermaster Sergeant T. J. Rees, Army Service Corps
Staff Quartermaster Sergeant (Acting Staff Sergeant Major) H. E. Reimann, Army Service Corps
Sapper (Acting Lance Corporal) R. W. Reynard, Royal Engineers
Artillery Corporal R. J. Reynolds, Royal Engineers
Armament Staff Sergeant G. H. Richardson, Army Ordnance Corps, attached Royal Field Artillery
Quartermaster Sergeant W. R. Ricketts, Essex Regiment
Private (Acting Mechanist Staff Sergeant (A.) J. A. Ritchie, Army Service Corps attached M. Ambulance Convoy. 
Superintending Clerk F. W. Roberts, Royal Engineers
Company Sergeant Major (Acting Sergeant Major) A. Robertson, Gordon Highlanders
Sub Conductor (Acting Conductor) C. E. W. Robinson, Army Ordnance Corps
2nd Corporal (Acting Sub Conductor) 0. D. Rolland, Army Ordnance Corps
Sergeant Major W. G. R. Rouse, Royal Army Medical Corps
Sergeant (Acting Staff Quartermaster Sergeant) W. J. Rowe, Army Service Corps
Corporal B. A. Rutton, Army Service Corps, attached London Field Ambulance
Staff Sergeant Major (Acting 1st Class Staff Sergeant Major) F. Rye, Army Service Corps
Sergeant V. W. Sagon, Royal Engineers
Private (Acting Sergeant) J. Sampson, Army Veterinary Corps
Lance Sergeant (Acting Staff Quartermaster Sergeant) C. J. Saunders, Army Service Corps
Staff Quartermaster Sergeant A. E. Savage, Army Service Corps
Private G. F. Scott, Dragoon Guards
Conductor H. Seyde, Army Ordnance Corps
Private H. E. Sharpe, Liverpool Regiment
Lance Corporal (Acting Company Sergeant Major) P. Sharpe, Army Service Corps (Mechanical Transport)
Company Quartermaster Sergeant (Acting Company Sergeant Major) E. J. Sheeby, Royal Anglesey Engineers, Special Reserve.
Sergeant Major E. J. Shelley, Middlesex Regiment
Quartermaster Sergeant E. Shepherd, Royal Army Medical Corps
Sergeant W. Sherman, Royal Engineers
Private (Acting Sergeant) F. Silver, Army Service Corps
1st Class Air Mechanic O. S. Singleton, Royal Flying Corps
Flight Sergeant E. F. Smith, Royal Flying Corps
Corporal (Acting Company Sergeant Major) E. S. Smith, Army Service Corps
Quarteremaster Sergeant W. Smith, Yorkshire Regiment, attached Egyptian Army.
Quartermaster Sergeant (Acting Sergeant Major) H. Soady, Royal Army Medical Corps
Staff Sergeant (Acting Staff Sergeant Major) V. C. Soggee, Army Service Corps
Engineering Clerk Sergeant (Acting Supertindending Clerk) Sergeant C. H. Soppitt, attached Royal Engineers
Quartermaster Sergeant A. P. Spackman, Royal Army Medical Corps
Sergeant H. V. Spraggs, Army Ordnance Corps, attached Egyptian Army
Company Sergeant Major (Acting Sergeant Major) T. J. Staines (formerly Coldstream Guards)
Sergeant H. W. Steward, Divisional Engineer, Royal Engineers
Sergeant S. M. Steward, Royal Field Artillery
Private (Actinbg Mechanist Staff Sergeant) H. Stewart, Army Service Corps
Acting Sergeant Major J. S. R. Stewart, Rifle Brigade
Gunner (Acting Fitter) P. E. Stilton, Royal Field Artillery
Sergeant (Acting Company Sergeant Major) F. W. Stokes, Royal Engineers
Corporal A. P. Stone, Army Servuce Corps
Sergeant J. Stott. Military Mounted Police, attached Cavalry Division
Sergeant H. B. Stringer, Royal Flying Corps
Sergeant R. M. Summerfield, Royal Engineers
Corporal (Acting Company Sergeant Major) A. C. Swain, Royal Engineers
Flight Sergeant R. J. Tallyn, Royal Flying Corps
Corporal (Acting Staff Sergeant) S. H. Taylor, Army Service Corps
Squadron Sergeant Major. W. Taylor, Machine Gun Corps
Lance Corporal (Acting Sergeant) J. W. Teasdale, Military Foot Police
Sergeant P. Tew, Bedfordshire Regiment
Company Sergeant Major T. W. Tubby, Royal Engineers
Lance Corporal. A. Thomas, London Regiment
Pioneer Sergeant W. Thomas, London Regiment
Private (Acting Corporal) W. H. Thomas, Army Service Corps
Staff Sergeant (Acting Staff Sergeant Major) R. Tindall, Army Service Corps
Corporal (Acting Sergeant) B. Tinton, Army Service Corps
Corporal (Acting Quartermaster Sergeant) W. Trump, Royal Engineers
Staff Sergeant Major (Acting 1st Class Staff Sergeant Major) A. E. Tucker, Army Service Corps
Corporal (Acting Sub-Conductor) M. Tully, Army Ordnance Corps
Sergeant A. Turner, Royal Field Artillery
Company Quartermaster Sergeant G. E. Unstead, Middlesex Regiment
Private H. Viner, Army Service Corps
Sergeant Major E. Wade, Manchester Regiment
Battery Sergeant Major C. E. Walkley, Royal Artillery
Smith-Gunner (Acting Fitter Staff Sergeant) P. H. Walton, Royal Garriuson Artillery
Flight Sergeant L. Wardley, Royal Flying Corps
Sergeant A. H. Wardrop, Royal Engineers
Forman of Works Quartermaster Sergeant A. Watkins, Royal Engineers
Lance Corporal (Acting Sub-Conductor) A. V. Watsham, Army Ordnance Corps
Sergeant T. Watson, London Regiment
Air Mechanic 1st Class T. P. Watson, Royal Flying Corps
Sub-Conductor R. T. Waugh, Miscellaneous List, Indian Army.
Staff Sergeant Major J. H. Webster, Army Service Corps
Battery Sergeant Major W. Weeks, Royal Field Artillery
Company Sergeant Major R. E. Westerman, Royal Engineers
Corporal A. White, Middlesex Regiment
Squadron Sergeant Major F. White, Hussars
Sergeant H. J. White, Reserve Army Signal Company
Corporal Lance Sergeant W. A. Whittaker, Royal Army Medical Corps
Sub-Conductor H.R. Willes, Army Ordnance Corps, attached Egyptian Army
Company Quartermaster Sergeant E. J. Williams, Royal Engineers
Corporal (Acting Staff Sergeant) G. Williams, Army Service Corps
Sergeant W. T. Williams, Royal Army Medical Corps
Staff Sergeant (Acting Superintending Clerk) J. E. Willsher, Establishment for Engineer Services, Royal Engineers
Fitter Corporal A. J. Wilson, Royal Field Artillery
Sergeant F. A. Woodall, Royal Flying Corps
Quartermaster Sergeant (Acting Superintending Clerk) G. A. Woolgar, Royal Engineers (attached G.H.Q.)
Conductor H. T. Woolner, Army Ordnance Corps
Private (Acting Sub-Conductor) D. Worsfold, Army Ordnance Corps
Farrier Quartermaster Sergeant J. Wyvill, Lancers
Private (Acting Corporal) A. V. Yarham, Army Service Corps

Australian Imperial Force
Company Sergeant Major C. E. Browne, Australian Infantry
Warrant Officer N. Cockfield, Australian Infantry 
Sergeant B. Conole, Australian Infantry
Sergeant E. Ellis, Australian Medical Corps
Sergeant-Cook A. G. Gibson, Australian Infantry
Company Quartermaster Sergeant N. A. Kent, Australian Infantry
Sergeant J. M. Lyons, Australian Infantry
Staff Sergeant C.G. Schroder, Australian Infantry
Sergeant G. Scott, H.Q., Australian Imperial Force, formerly Australian Infantry
Sergeant J. E. S. Stevens, Australian Engineers
Lance Corporal S.R. Tevelein, Australian Infantry
Bombardier G. C. Watson, Australian Artillery

Canadian Contingent
Battery Sergeant Major G. A. Biddiscombe, Canadian Divisional Ammunition Column, Canadian Artillery
Quartermaster Sergeant W. G. Campbell, Pioneer Battalion, Canadian Infantry
Corporal (Acting Sergeant) W. H. Crothy, Canadian Infantry
Sergeant Major J. F. Cummins, Canadian Corps of Military Staff Clerks, Canadian Army Corps, H.Q.
Sergeant N. J. L. Davy, Canadian Infantry
Sergeant C.B. Elliott, Canadian Engineers
Sergeant H. Ellis, Pioneer Battalion, Canadian Infantry
Quartermaster Sergeant (Armament Artificer) G. H. Fairlie, Canadian Ordnance Corp, attached Canadian Field Artillery
Sergeant C.T. Fitzpatrick, Canadian Infantry
Sergeant A. McQ. Gibson, Canadian Army Medical Corps 
Quartermaster Sergeant G. B. W. Goodall, Canadian Infantry
Sub-Conductor W. G. Hale, Canadian Ordnance Corps
Staff Sergeant F. King, Canadian Army Service Corps
Private (Acting Sergeant) H. M. Lewis, Canadian Engineers
Sergeant C. A. Lumb, Canadian Army Service Corps
Sergeant W. R. Lunnis, Canadian Infantry
Acting Company Sergeant Major D. V. McPherson, Canadian Postal Corps
Private J. J. Nicholls, Canadian Army Medical Corps
Sergeant Major C. W. Parker, Canadian Engineers
Sergeant B. Singleton, Canadian Army Service Corps
Corporal G. Walker, Canadian Army Service Corps
Sergeant Major S.G. Webb, Canadian Artillery

New Zealand Force
 Sergeant J. N. Beattie, N.Z. Rifle Brigade
Staff Sergeant D. Galbraith, N.Z. Brigade, H.Q.
Sergeant H. A. Holz, Divisional H.Q., N.Z. Military Mounted Police
Company Sergeant Major W. H. Simmons, N.Z. Ordnance Corps 
Sergeant Major A. S. Thompson, Auckland Regiment

Military Medal (MM) 
Louisa Nolan
Florence Williams
Corporal H. Brogan, Leinster Regiment 
Private H. Hagues, late Nottinghamshire & Derbyshire Regiment
Sergeant A. McMaster, Royal Irish Fusiliers 
Private G. Parsons, Royal Dublin Fusiliers 
Sergeant G. R. Preece, Royal Dublin Fusiliers

Conspicuous Gallantry Medal (CGM)
In recognition of services in the Battle of Jutland —
Colour Sergeant Abraham Spooner, Royal Marine Artillery. Second in command of the Marine detachment of HMS Warrior. After his guns were no longer required, he showed the greatest gallantry and initiative in rescuing wounded in dense smoke and gas fumes from Marines mess deck.
Leading Stoker Thomas McGovern. Showed much courage in extinguishing a large fire, which could only be reached through a shell hole surrounded by intense heat, fumes and smoke. His behaviour was highly commendable.

Indian Order of Merit (IOM)
Second Class

Sowar Udey Singh, Lancers
Jemadar Zari Gul Khan, Cavalry
Dafadar Nihal Singh, Cavalry
Lance Dafadar Mutthra Singh, Cavalry
Jemadar Abdul Rahim Khan, Lancers
Sowar Indar Singh, Lancers
Dafadar Harditt Singh, Jacobs Horse
Sowar Julab Singh, Jodhpur Imperial Service Lancers
Subadar Attar Khan, Punjabis

Indian Distinguished Service Medal (IDSM)
Ressaidar Abdul Latf Khan, Lancers
Jemadar Dhara Singh, Lancers, attached Machine Gun Squadron
Kot Dafadar Ram-Pershad, Lancers
Dafadar Jiwan Singh, Lancers
Dafadar Mazar Ali Shah, Cavalry
Jemadar Amir Singh, Cavalry
Jemadar Bachittar Singh, Cavalry
Dafadar Arjan Singh, Cavalry
Quartermaster Dafadar Odey Chand, Cavalry
Ward Orderly Abdul Wahas Khan, Cavalry, attached Sialkot Cavalry Field Ambulance
Risaldar Hazura Singh, Lancers, attached Machine Gun Squadron
Sowar Hashim Khan, Cavalry, attached Machine Gun Squadron
Farrier Wali Mahomed Khan, Cavalry attached Machine Gun Squadron
Kot Dafadar Khuda Baksh Khan, Lancers
Dafadar Bhagwan Singh, Lancers
Sowar Mahomed Sharif Khan, Lancers, attached Machine Gun Squadron
Sowar Hidayat Khan, Lancers, attached Machine Gun Squadron
Sowar Lall Singh, Lancers
Havildar Taja Khan, Lancers, attached Royal Horse Artillery
Ressaidar Ghulam Husain, Lancers
Dafadar Gulbar Khan, Lancers
Dafadar Mahan Singh, Lancers
Risaldar Ali Sher Khan, Cavalry
Risaldar Konsal Singh, Cavalry
Salutri Major Ghulam Mahrub, Cavalry
Dafadar Kasim Khan, Cavalry
Dafadar Mahomed Zaman Khan, Cavalry
NSowar Ward Orderly Sirdar Singh, Cavalry, attached Secunderabad Cavalry Field Ambulance
Risaldar Azam Ali, Cavalry, attached Lancers
Dafadar Sher Singh, Cavalry, attached Ambala Cavalry Field Ambulance
Kot Dafadar Khadar Nawaz (Pack Store Dafadar), Cavalry, attached Secunderabad Cavalry Field Amb
Risaldar Chanda Singh, Lancers
Jemadar Mahan Singh, Lancers, attached Machine Gun Squadron
Kot Dafadar Imdad All, Lancers, attached Army Veterinary Corps
Kot Dafadar Lall Singh, Lancers
Temp. Ressaidar Rewat Singh, Cavalry
Dafadar Sabdal Khan, Cavalry
Dafadar Ghulam Muhi-Ud-Din-Khan, Cavalry
Lance Dafadar Allah-Ud-Din-Khan, Cavalry
Acting Lance Dafadar Budha Khan, Cavalry
Dafadar Dalip Singh, Cavalry
Kot Dafadar Abdul Khalik, Cavalry, attached Machine Gun Squadron
Kot Dafadar Sahes Singh, Cavalry
Sowar Hazrat Shah, Cavalry
Jemadar Ram Singh, Cavalry
Kot Dafadar Ghilzai Khan, Cavalry
Dafadar Lai Khan, Cavalry
Dafadar Sherjam Khan, Cavalry
Lance Dafadar Mehr Singh, Cavalry
Jemadar Kehar Sing, Lancers
Dafadar Bhur Singh, Lancers
Dafadar Rup Singh, Lancers
Lance Dafadar Zalim Singh, Lancers
Havildar Fateh Ali, Infantry, attached Mhow Cavalry Field Ambulance
Sepoy Mahomed Shah, Infantry, attached Mhow Cavalry Field Ambulance
Ward Orderly Devi Dyal, Infantry, attached Secunderabad Cavalry Field Ambulance
Sepoy Chowdre Khan, Infantry

Distinguished Service Medal (DSM)
Chief Engine-Room Artificer, 1st Class, Frank Dymond, O.N. 268895.
Chief Engine-Room Artificer, 1st Class, Herbert Neal, O.N. 268656 (Dev.).
Chief Engine-Room Artificer, 2nd Class, William Ford, O.N. 347366 (Dev.).
Chief Engine-Room Artificer, 2nd Class, Robert Charles Lees, O.N. 270022 (Po.).
Chief Petty Officer William Henry Palmer, O.N. 159159 (Dev.).
Chief Stoker Frederick Aldred, O.N. 296182 (Po.). 
Ship's Steward Arthur James Litton, O.N. 158887 (Dev.).
Colour Sergeant Leonard Daw Roberts, Royal Marine Light Infantry, No. Po./10345.
Sergeant Harry Richard Lucas, Royal Marine Artillery, No. R.M.A./8139.
Chief Yeoman of Signals George Whitby, O.N. 182090 (Ch.).
Petty Officer William Henry Hoyle, O.N. 231577 (Dev.).
Petty Officer Tomson Matthews, O.N. 194798 (Dev.). 
Petty Officer, 1st Class, Edward Charles Street, O.N. 190782 (Po.).
Stoker Petty Officer George Parmenter, (Ch.). O.N. 231316
S.B.S. Charles Robert Allwright, O.N. 351201 (Ch.).
Engine-Room Artificer, 3rd Class, Edward Frank Roser, O.N.M. 2331 (Po.).
Stoker, 1st Class, Patrick Walsh, O.N. 307219 (Po.).
Able Seaman Hubert Samuel Bevis, O.N. 214513 (Po,).
Officer's Steward, 2nd Class, Frank Pook, O.N. 364787 (Dev.).
Musician Arthur George Sylvester Flippence, Royal Marines, No. R.M.B./1240.
Chief Petty Order Thomas Robert Cozens, O.N. 126325 (R.F.R. Po./A1810).
Chief Petty Officer James Henry Lancey, O.N. 192924 (Dev.)
Chief Petty Officer John Edward Perritt, O.N. 117897 (R.F.R. Ch./A754).
Petty Officer, 1st Class, George Charles Day, O.N. 178422 (R.F.R. Ch./B5056).
Petty Officer William Herbert Winton, O.N. 191799 (Ch.).
Petty Officer 1st Class, William Austin Adams, O.N. 122336 (R.F.R. Ch./A895).
Able Seaman William Robert Bull, O.N. J15960 (Ch.).
Able Seaman David Thomas Elliott, O.N. J13695 (Po.).
Seaman William Spry, Royal Naval Reserve, O.N. 4889A
Boy Telegraphist Ernest Kelly, O.N. J35560. 
Engine-Room Artificer, 1st Class, Albert George Pearson, O.N. 271010 (Ch.).
Stoker Petty Officer William Driver, O.N. 295045 (Po.). 
Engineman William Betmead, Royal Naval Reserve, O.N. 1054 E.S.
Engineman Fred William Briggs, Royal Naval Reserve, O.N. 1106 E.S.
Engineman Harold Cooke, Royal Naval Reserve, O.N. 1776 E.S.
Engineman Charles Edward East, Royal Naval Reserve., O.N. 222 E.S.
Engineman William Fleming, Royal Naval Reserve, O.N. 600 E.S.
Engineman James Reid, Royal Naval Reserve, O.N. 18 T.S. 
Engineman Charles Edward Vittery, Royal Naval Reserve, O.N. 1601 E.S.
Engineman Fred Piercy Wilson, Royal Naval Reserve, O.N. 34 E.S.
Trimmer Richard Morrison, Royal Naval Reserve, O.N. 215 T.S.
2nd Hand Richard Combe, Royal Naval Reserve, O.N. 447.
2nd Hand John Noble Stephen, Royal Naval Reserve, O.N. 2480 S.A.
2nd Hand Francis John Williams, Royal Naval Reserve, O.N. 1948 S.A.
Deck Hand Alexander Davidson, Royal Naval Reserve, O.N. 158 D.A.
Deck Hand Bert Huntingdon, Royal Naval Reserve, O.N. 390 D.A.
Deck Hand Daniel Nithsdale, Royal Naval Reserve, O.N. 4253 D.A.
Deck Hand David William Leon Simpson, Royal Naval Reserve, O.N. 1397 D.A.
Deck Hand Charles Shell, Royal Naval Reserve, O.N. 671 D.A.
Leading Seaman Albert William Broadway, O.N. J 2128.
Acting Leading Stoker Lionel Elsom Corker, O.N. K 7145.
Leading Signalman Frederick Thomas Davis, O.N. J 4828.
Engine-Room Artificer, 3rd Class, Sidney Lewis Dole Frampton, O.N. 272185.
Petty Officer William Edmund Goddard, O.N. 201173. 
Petty Officer William Harry Gunton, O.N. 211821. 
Petty Officer Richard Charles Hammett, O.N. 211319. 
Petty Officer Edwin Walter Harrison, O.N.176446.
Petty Officer Edward Haydon, O.N. 204255.
Able Seaman George William Hodder, O.N. 216122. 
Acting Leading Stoker Walter Humphries, O.N. 310331.
Petty Officer John Ilott, O.N. 191730.
Acting Leading Stoker Charles Kessell, O.N. K 1517. 
Leading Seaman Benjamin Charles Litchfield, O.N. 226273.
Leading Seaman Patrick Andrew McEvoy, O.N. 229316.
Chief Stoker George Plain, O.N. 280740.
Petty Officer Alfred Albert Ernest Phillips, O.N. 228052.
Stoker, 1st Class, Percy Sidney Saville, K 10730.
Leading Telegraphist Albert Thomas Sibthorpe, O.N. J 7280.
Petty Officer Roland Thomas Stripp, O.N. 236087. 
Leading Stoker Albert Owen Tilbury, O.N. K 1547. 
Engine-room Artificer, 3rd Class, Alfred Alexander Truscott, O.N. M 1438.
Acting Chief Engine-Room Artificer, 2nd Class, Alexander Weir, O.N. 271563.
Able Seaman Harry Winter, O.N. 239599.
Chief Engineer Frederick Livingstone Angus, Nigeria Marine Contingent.
Chief Engine-Room Artificer, 1st Class, Albert Charles Burton, O.N. 269517.
Mechanic Harry Clifford Curtis, O.N. 302704. 
Petty Officer Herbert Henry Bond Whitty, O.N. 191257.
Electrical Artificer, 2nd Class, Henry Frederick Williams, O.N. 347904.
Able Seaman Albert Edward John Stevens, O.N. J23636.
Private William Frederick Hammond, Royal Marine Light Infantry, No. Ch./17137.
Corporal Frederick William Hemmings, Royal Marine Light Infantry, No. Ch./16851.
Lance-Corporal Albert Charles Rutland, Royal Marine Light Infantry, No. Ch./15142.
Petty Officer John Butters, O.N. 137522 (R.F.R., Dev./A3497).
Deck Hand Leonard Findlay, Royal Naval Reserve, O.N. 4842 D.A.
Petty Officer Albert Edward Gregory, O.N. 209657 (Po.).
Petty Officer Frederick Dart, O.N. 214897 (Po.).
Petty Officer Joseph Richard Ashfield, O.N. 227875 (Dev.).
Engine-Room Artificer, 3rd Class, Frank. William Crabbe, O.N. M1483 (Po.).
Petty Officer, 1st Class, William John Adams, O.N. 189087 (Dev.).
Leading Seaman Daniel Joseph Donovan, O.N. 204180 (Dev.).
Petty Officer Thomas Heffernan, O.N. 158031.
Acting Chief Armourer Albert Henry Hinks, O.N. 343208.
Armourers Crew Ernest Charles King, O.N. 16034.
Leading Seaman James Robert Sole, O.N. 240147. 
Able Seaman Charles George Bremer Barham, O.N. J9079.
Serjeant Walter Henry France, Royal Marine Artillery, No. R.M.A./5510.
Gunner Adam Fenton, Royal Marine Artillery, No. R.M.A./ 6904 (R.F.A./B/353).
Petty Officer William Ernest Sims, O.N. 199647 (Dev.).
Petty Officer Mechanic Charles Ernest Cobb, Royal Naval Air Service, O.N. F4623.
Petty Officer Mechanic Donald McLean Graham, Royal Naval Air Service, O.N. F4625.
Able Mechanic Herbert William Marsh, O.N. J16274 (Dev.).
Seaman George Behenna, Royal Naval Reserve, O.N. 3996B. 
Signaller George Sydney Tosker, Royal Naval Volunteer Reserve, O.N. London, 3/2502.

King's Police Medal (KPM)

England and Wales
Police Forces
Captain Cecil Mitchell Innes, Chief Constable of Lincolnshire
Frank Richardson, Chief Constable of Hereford
Alexander Bruce, Chief Superintendent and Chief Clerk of the Bristol City Police
Robert Duckworth, Superintendent in the Liverpool City Police
James William Olive, Superintendent in the Metropolitan Police Force
Harry Osborn, Superintendent and Deputy Chief Constable of the Lincolnshire Constabulary
John Ottaway, Superintendent in the City of London Police
Arthur Simmonds, Superintendent in the Surrey Police
William Wood, Superintendent and Deputy Chief Constable of the Hertfordshire Constabulary
John Clynes, Detective Inspector in the Manchester City Police
Arthur Askew, Sergeant in the Metropolitan. Police Force
John Collins, Sergeant in the Birmingham City Police
Herbert Archer, Constable in the Metropolitan Police Force, Rosyth Dockyard Division
Albert Edward Bell, Constable in the Isle of Man Constabulary
George Burton, Constable in the Metropolitan Police Force, Portsmouth Dockyard Division
Thomas Parnell Gibbons, Constable in the Lancashire Constabulary
William Green, Constable in the Lancashire Constabulary
William Hall, Constable in the Birmingham City Police
George Bowles, Constable in the Metropolitan Police Force
William Longhurst, Constable in the Metropolitan Police Force
Thomas Slipper, Constable in the Metropolitan Police Force

Fire Brigades
Sidney Gompertz Gamble, Divisional Officer, London Fire Brigade
Arthur Reginald Dyer, Divisional Officer, London Fire Brigade
William Gardiner, Station Officer, London Fire Brigade

Scotland
Police Forces
Finlay Forbes, Superintendent in the Edinburgh City Police
John Samuel, Superintendent in the Glasgow City Police
Donald Macleod, Constable in the Glasgow City Police

Fire Brigades
Joseph Gillan, Senior Superintendent, Glasgow Fire Brigade

Ireland
Police Forces
George Bedell Ruttledge, County Inspector in the Royal Irish Constabulary
Patrick Haugh, Sergeant in the Dublni Metropolitan Police
William O'Connell and Thomas Reilly, Sergeants in the Royal Irish Constabulary
John Barton, Constable in the Dublin Metropolitan Police
Thomas Barrett, Constable in the Dublin Metropolitan Police
James H. Coulter, Constable in the Dublin Metropolitan Police
Eugene Bratton, Constable in the Royal Irish Constabulary

British India
Police Forces
Cyril Edward Sweney, Acting Superintendent, Madras Police
Alfred Francis Bulkley, Assistant Superintendent, Madras Police
Kandaswami Mudali, Head Constable, Chingleput District Police, Madras Police
Muhammad Ali, Constable, Chingleput District Police, Madras Police
Vepa Kommah Subramania Ayyar, Third-grade Head Constable, Cuddapah District Police, Madras Police
Fateh Khan, Head Constable, Larkana District Police, Bombay Police
Raymond Thomas Barker, Deputy Superintendent of Police, Karachi, Bombay Police
Rao Saheb Girdharsing Maniram, Third-Grade, Inspector, Bombay Police
Satis Chandra Banarji, Inspector, Bengal Police
Satis Chandra Mazumdar, Inspector, Bengal Police
Bhupendra Nath Chatarji, Officiating Inspector, Bengal Police
Kinsey Beaumont Welford Thomas, Deputy Inspector-General, Bengal Police
Reginald Clarke, Commissioner, Bengal Police
Bernard Anson Westbrook, Chief Officer, Calcutta Fire Brigade, Bengal Police
Muhammad Khurshed, Deputy Superintendent, Bengal Police
Jadu Ram, Constable, Bengal Police
Rajendra Kishor Sen, Sub-Inspector, Bengal Police
Hafizuddin Shaikh, Police Constable, Bengal Police
Charles Edward Walker Sands, Superintendent, United Provinces Police
Thomas Arthur Leslie Scott O'Connor, Superintendent, United Provinces Police
Mubarak Ali Khan, Sub-Inspector, United Provinces Police
Sarda Prasad, Constable, United Provinces Police
Duncan Donald, Superintendent, Punjab Police
Frederick Charles Isemonger, Superintendent, Punjab Police
Colin Andrew Macpherson, Superintendent, Punjab Police
Mohammad Sadiq, Head Constable of the Ferozepore District Police, Punjab Police
Ganda Singh, Foot Constable, Punjab Police
Niaz Ahmad, Sub-Inspector of the Ludhiana District Police, Punjab Police
Robert Charles' Elphinstone Underwood, District Superintendent, Toungoo, Burma Civil Police
Cecil Herbert Munro Roberts, District Superintendent, Myaungmya, Burma Civil Police
Peter McDonald Burke, Officiating District Superintendent, Prome, Burma Civil Police
Joseph Alexis Vardon, Deputy Superintendent, Twante, Burma Civil Police
Maung Aung Gyi, Inspector (second grade), Kyaiklat, Burma Civil Police
Ram Lagan Singh and Sheodhari Singh, Constables, Bihar and Orissa Police
Rai Sahib Janaki Ballabh Dae, Superintendent of Police of the Mayurbhanj State
Clarence Charles Hughes-Hallett, Deputy Inspector-General, Central Provinces Police
Khan Sahib Maulvi Sharafat Ali Chaudhuri, Deputy Superintendent, Assam Civil Police
Sarbajit Thapa, Subadar, Lakhimpur Military Police Battalion, Assam Military Police
Harold Arden Close  Inspector-General, North-West Frontier Province Police
Mahomed Yusaf Khan, Sub-Inspector (second grade), North-West Frontier Province Police
Gul Mahomed, Foot Constable (third grade), North-West Frontier Province Police
Mahomed Akram Khan, Sub-Inspector (second grade), North-West Frontier Province Police
Futteh Hussain, Sub-Inspector, Baluchistan Police

Overseas Dominions
Police Forces
John Cullen, Commissioner of Police in New Zealand
Sydney Watson, Third Officer, New South Wales Fire Brigades
John Francis Ford, Fourth Officer, New South Wales Fire Brigades
Salabad Khan, Constable, Singapore Police Force
Thomas Alexander, Inspector (1st class), Jamaica Constabulary
Putifar Daniel Julien, Corporal, Mauritius Police Force
Michel Aza, Constable, Mauritius Police Force
Yianni Haji Georghi, Private, Cyprus Military Police
Joseph Blades, Sergeant-Major of Police, British Honduras
Sunder Singh, Native Officer, Federated Malay States Police

Imperial Service Order (ISO)

Indian Civil Service
Edward Evans Harvey, Chief Accountant in the Office of the Director of Ordnance Factories in India

Imperial Service Medal (ISM)

Home Civil Service
Charles Adams, Inspector, Post Office, Hastings
Charles John Allwood, Stamper, Inland Revenue Department
Arthur Ball, Postman, Birmingham
James Walter Ball, Postman, Macclesfield
Joseph Frederic Banks, Sorter, London Postal Service
Benjamin Christopher Barge, Hospital Principal Warder, Brixton Prison
James Barlow, Shipwright, Chatham Dockyard
Walter William Brightman, Leading Man of Labourers, Sheerness Dockyard
Thomas Frederick Brown, Head Postman, London Postal Service
Carmelo Bugeja, Skilled Labourer, Chief Constructor's Department, Malta Dockyard
James Hunter Burch, First Class Inspector and District Officer, Mercantile Marine Office, Board of Trade
Francis Joseph Burke, Sorting Clerk and Telegraphist, Dublin
William Pincombe Burridge, Principal Warder, Wakefield Prison
Alfred Henry Charrosin, Telegraphist, Central Telegraph Office
Edward Cheaney, Hospital Principal Warder, Brixton Prison
Joseph Churton, Sorting Clerk and Telegraphist, Stoke-on-Trent
Herbert Thomas Clark, Postman, London Postal Service
George Clarke, Rigger, Chatham Dockyard
Thomas Mason Cole, Shipwright, Portsmouth Dockyard
James Cooper, Engineer, Class I, Birmingham Prison
Georgette Elizabeth Cottrall, Counter Clerk and Telegraphist, London Postal Service
Emily Jane Craig, Sorting Clerk and Telegraphist, Glasgow
James Cripps, Postman, Bilton, Rugby
Henry Hirst Crosland, Postman, Huddersfield
Stephen George Durdson Cuer, Second Class Draftsman (Assistant Overseer), Portsmouth Dockyard
George Duxon, Chief Warder, Class II, Lincoln Prison
Richard Henry Feasey, Postman, Birmingham
Annie Louise File, Sorting Clerk and Telegraphist, Falmouth
John Finn, Overseer, London Postal Service
William Dry Fiske, Telegraphist, Central Telegraph Office
Albion George Fletcher, Clerk and Schoolmaster, Grade I, Hull Prison
Frederick Fowle, Telegraphist, Central Telegraph Office
Robert Henry Fox, First Class Draftsman, Portsmouth Dockyard
Henry Francis, Sorter, London Postal Service
Thomas William Frew, Overseer, London Postal Service
Robert George Gill, Painter, Devonport Dockyard
Thomas Glynn, Sorter, London Postal Service
Arthur Goodwin, Head Postman, London Postal Service
Robert Elias Gosney, Tracer, Accountant-General's Department, General Post Office
John Watson Graham, Postman, Newcastle upon Tyne
James Alexander Grant, Shipwright (Chargeman), Portsmouth Dockyard
James Grimsditch, Warder, Grade I, Manchester Prison
Thomas Hart, Sorter, London Postal Service
William Harvey, Postman, Bangor
Charles Alfred Herzog, Head Postman (Division I), London Postal Service
Thomas Hicks, Preventive Officer, Hull
George Hillary, Joiner, Portsmouth Dockyard
Walter Hobbs, Postman, Hitchin
William Henry Holdaway, Sorter, London Postal Service
Charles Humphries, Postman, Harlow
Amos James, Postman, Burghclere, Newbury
Henry Joce, Shipwright, Devonport Dockyard
Marion Charlotte Johns, Returner (Old Establishment), Returned Letter Section, London Postal Service
Edward Thomas Johnson, Overseer of Mail Bag Apparatus, Controller's Office, London Postal Service
John Kavanagh, Postman, Waterford
Robert Kelly, Stamper, Inland Revenue Department
John Kennedy, Postman, Coupar Angus, Perthshire
James Kernick, Warder, Grade I, Plymouth Prison
George Henry Lakeman, Skilled Labourer, Devonport Dockyard
Roger Latham, Postman, Dawley, S.O. Wellington, Salop
Thomas Lear, Principal Warder, Birmingham Prison
Ralph Denham Ley, Telegraphist, Central Telegraph Office
Robert McDonald, Assistant Superintendent, Engraving Division, Ordnance Survey, Southampton
John Macloghlin, Boundary Examiner, 4th Division, Ordnance Survey, Norwich
Barbara Ann McMillan, Counter Clerk and Telegraphist, London Postal Service
Mary Margaret Macnamara, Sorting Clerk and Telegraphist, Dublin
Jeremiah Mahony, Postman, Farranfore, Killarney
William Robert Mattocks, Skilled Labourer, Chatham Dockyard
William James Merren, Skilled Labourer, Devonport Dockyard
Henry Millard, Postman, Trowbridge
Edgar Mitchell, Clerk and Schoolmaster, Grade I, Winchester Prison.
Stephen Morris, Postman, Birmingham
Lilian Annie Muckle, Writing Assistant, Money Order Department, General Post Office
Joseph Newcombe, Postman, Leamington Spa
John Thomas Nicholls, Preventive Officer, Liverpool
James Nunn, Postman, Wrentham, Halesworth
Cornelius Christopher Parfitt, Sorting Clerk and Telegraphist, Norwich
William James Childs Peard, Skilled Labourer, Devonport Dockyard
Felix Perry, Overseer, London Postal Service
Francis Clemson Phillips, Scripture Reader, Dartmoor Prison
William Pickett, Sorter, London Postal Service
George Playford, Postman, King's Lynn
Albert Rabey, Shipwright, Devonport Dockyard
John R Smith Rean, Devonport Dockyard
William Hogarth Reid, Plan Examiner, 9th Division, Ordnance Survey, York
John Henry Richards, Shipwright, Devonport Dockyard
John Roberton, Shipwright, Portsmouth Dockyard
William Robinson, Overseer, Post Office, Blackpool
John Ryder, Postman, Dysart, Kirkcaldy
Harry Robert Saunders, Postman, Stroud
George Shea, Sorter, London Postal Service
William Sillifant, Postman, Beaworthy, Okehampton
William George Snook, Rigger (Chargeman), Portsmouth Dockyard
Robert Stitson, Skilled Labourer, Devonport Dockyard
Henry Stock, Single Station Labourer, Sheerness Dockyard
John Henry Styles, Telegraphist, Central Telegraph Office
Adolphus Taylor, Warder, Grade I, Pentonville Prison
Frank Thomas, Postman, Birmingham
Henry Thomas, Postman, Brough, Hull
John Thomas Tozer, Smith, Devonport Dockyard
Thomas Mardon Ttenery, Shipwright, Chatham Dockyard
Frederick Turner, postman, Canterbury
David Samuel Underwood, Postman, Stevenage
Walter Wallis, Postman, Barnet
William Henry Watters, Head Postman, London Postal Service
John Whamond, Overseer, Post Office, Liverpool
Frederick Henry White, Postman, Ashburton, Newton Abbot
Walter William Wickham, Master of Yardcraft, Chatham Dockyard
Martha Anne Wilkinson, Sorting Clerk and Telegraphist, Keighley
James Willgress, Postman, Castle Acre, Swatham
John Williams, Shipwright, Portsmouth Dockyard
Edwin Matthew Wise, Tracer, Accountant-General's Department, General Post Office
William Wise, Postman, Cockermouth

Colonial Civil Service
Department of Railways and Canals, Canada
Hermenegilde Aubin, Conductor, Levis
Thomas Clifford Ayer, Conductor, Moncton
Télesphore Begin, Wheel Press Man, Rivière-du-Loup
David Pearson Bell, Car Inspector, Moncton
Joseph Boucher, Brakeman, Lévis
Dennis Bourgeois, Section Foreman, Memramcook
John Herbert Brown, Engineer's Assistant, Moncton
Nathan Burris, Hostler, Truro
Leandre Chenard, Baggageman, Lévis
Robert Cullen, Stores Issuer, Truro
Joseph Damours, Brakeman, Rivière-du-Loup
Edward Daley, Section Foreman, Gloucester Junction
William Allan Davies, Foreman, Moncton
Frank Derouin, Conductor, Lévis
Edward Doucett, Trackman, Petit-Rocher
Richard Dougan, Engineman, Charlottetown
Xavier Dubé, Section Foreman, St. Moise
Robert Dunbar, Conductor, Loggieville
James Essery, Section Foreman, Kensington
David Ferguson, Section Foreman, Wentworth
Peter Fogarty, Section Foreman, Sydney
George Forgues, Brakeman, Lévis
George Frève, Section Foreman, St. Paschal
Peter Alexander Gallagher, Section Foreman, Quispamsis
Andrew Gallant, Trackman, Millstream
Thomas Gillan, Blacksmith, Charlottetown
John Gillespie, Chargehand, Moncton
Adam Purdy Giles, Roadmaster, Newcastle
Frank Gillis, Locomotive Cleaner, Cape Traverse
James Gorham, Checker, St. John
Alexander Black Gray, Roadmaster, New Glasgow
John Guess, Blacksmith, Halifax
John Hackett, Engineman, Moncton
Thomas Hanway, Engineman, Truro
Joseph Louis Hébert, Conductor, Rivière-du-Loup
William Robert Hoey, Fireman, Moncton
Aaron Hubley, Carpenter, Halifax
Charles Bedford Keith, Station Agent, Berry's Mills
Fortunat Laliberté, Conductor, Lévis
Philippe Leclerc, Chargeman, Rivière-du-Loup
Edwin Nelson Lockhart, Bridge Inspector, Moncton
William Brouard MacKenzie, Right of Way and Lease Agent, Moncton
William McAdoo, Carpenter, St. John
Patrick McCloskey, Boilermaker, Charlottetown
James Steward McClure, Carpenter, Moncton
John McDonald, Section Foreman, Millstream
George Hamilton McEwen, Freight Agent, Truro
John Thomas McGinn, Conductor, Moncton
Hugh McLeod, Extra Gang Foreman, Emerald
John McPherson, Fitter, Charlottetown
Louis Martin, Car Repairer, Rivière-du-Loup
Samuel Miller, Foreman Carpenter, Newcastle
George Moore, Machinist, Moncton
Louis Moreau, Stationary Boiler Fireman, Lévis
John Albert Murray, Station Agent, Shediac
John Eric Oakleaf, Engineman, Dalhousie
Peter Oliver, Tool Inspector, Charlottetown
Luc Séraphin Paulet, Conductor, Lévis
William Richard Payne, Station Agent, Newcastle
Pierre Philip Pettigrew, Baggagemaster, Rivière-du-Loup
John Phelan, Porter, Halifax
William Robert Powell, Section Foreman, Painsec Junction
James Roche, Section Foreman, Bedford
Didace Rodrigue, Operator, Rivière-du-Loup
John Ryan, Section Foreman, Nauwigewauk
Charles Edward Simmons, Painter, Charlottetown
William Harvey Steeves, Fitter, Moncton
Arthur Stockall, Foreman Blacksmith, Moncton
John Sullivan, Section Foreman, Rogersville
Benjamin Tucker, Foreman Pipe Fitter, Moncton
Frederick William Welling, Engineman, Moncton
Frederick Wright, Hostler, St. John
James Chapman Wortman, Carpenter, Moncton

Miscellaneous Colonial
Thomas Baker, Lightkeeper, Department of Marine and Fisheries, Pease Island, Nova Scotia
William Noah Collier, Senior Warder, Prisons Department, New South Wales
Michael James Collins, Chief Warder, Prisons Department, New South Wales
William Henry Coulsen, First Class Warder, Prisons Department, New South Wales
John Coyne, Police Sergeant, First Class, New South Wales
John A Police Sergeant Curtis, First Class, New South Wales
James Goulding Draper, Police Inspector, Third Class, New South Wales
Percy Fortescue, Police Sergeant, First Class, New South Wales
James Geraghty, Senior Inspector of Police, Queensland
John Joseph Manuel, Police Sergeant, Second Class, New South Wales
James Meldrum, Police Sergeant, First Class, New South Wales
John Murdoch, Police Class, New South Wales
Thomas Ogilvie Porter, Queensland
James Rochford, Police Class, New South Wales
Alfred Percy Young, Police Sergeant, Third Class, New South Wales

References

New Year Honours
1917 awards
1917 in Australia
1917 in Canada
1917 in India
1917 in New Zealand
1917 in the United Kingdom